= Principality of Wales =

Medieval polity in Wales

Coordinates: 52.3°N 3.6°W

Principality of Wales Tywysogaeth Cymru (Welsh)
- 1267–1283: rule by the Princes of Gwynedd; 1283–1542: possession of the English Crown
- Arms of Llywelyn ap Gruffudd (1255–1282) Arms of the English Prince of Wales (1399–1509)

- Wales after the Treaty of Montgomery of 1267: Gwynedd, Llywelyn ap Gruffudd's principality Territories conquered by Llywelyn ap Gruffudd Territories of Llywelyn's vassals Lordships of the Marcher barons Lordships of the King of England Kingdom of England
- Status: Client kingdom (1267–1283); Dependent territory of England (1283–1542)
- Official languages: Anglo-Norman (until the mid-14th century); Middle English; Middle Welsh
- Religion: Roman Catholicism (1267-1534) Anglicanism (1534-1542)
- Demonyms: Welsh, Cymreig
- Government: Monarchy
- Prince
  - 1267–1282: Llywelyn ap Gruffudd
  - 1282–1283: Dafydd ap Gruffudd
  - 1301–1542: Edward of Caernarvon and subsequent heirs to the English throne
- Historical era: Middle Ages
  - Treaty of Montgomery: 1267
  - Treaty of Aberconwy: 1277
  - Statute of Rhuddlan: 3 March 1284
  - Welsh Revolt: 1294–1295
  - Glyndŵr Rising: 1400-1415
  - Laws in Wales Acts: 1535–1542
- Currency: Penny (ceiniog)
Preceded by	Succeeded by
Kingdom of Gwynedd; Deheubarth	Kingdom of England
- Today part of: *United Kingdom: Wales; England

The Principality of Wales (Welsh: Tywysogaeth Cymru) was the territory ruled over by Llywelyn ap Gruffudd from 1267 to 1282, and afterwards by his brother Dafydd ap Gruffudd from 1282 to 1283. Following the conquest of Wales by Edward I of England of 1277 to 1283, those parts of Wales retained under the direct control of the English crown, principally in the north and west of the country, were re-constituted as a new Principality of Wales and ruled either by the monarch or the monarch's heir though not formally incorporated into the Kingdom of England. This was ultimately accomplished with the Laws in Wales Acts 1535–1542 when the Principality ceased to exist as a separate entity.

The Principality was founded in 1267 by the Prince of Gwynedd, Llywelyn ap Gruffudd, who after conquering much of Wales in 1257 and proclaiming himself Prince of Wales in correspondence with Scottish barons, was acknowledged in this title by Henry III of England in the Treaty of Montgomery.

The period of de facto independence ended with Edward I's conquest of the principality between 1277 and 1283. Under the Statute of Rhuddlan, the principality lost its independence and became effectively an annexed territory of the English crown. From 1301, the crown's lands in north and west Wales formed part of the appanage of England's heir apparent, with the title "Prince of Wales". On accession of the prince to the English throne, the lands and title became merged with the Crown again. On two occasions Welsh claimants to the title rose up in rebellion during this period, although neither ultimately succeeded.

Since the Laws in Wales Acts 1535–1542, which formally incorporated all of Wales within the Kingdom of England, there has been no geographical or constitutional basis for describing any of the territory of Wales as a principality, although the term has occasionally been used in an informal sense to describe the country, and in relation to the honorary title of Prince of Wales.

== Native principality ==
The Principality of Wales was created By Llywelyn ap Gruffudd, who began his rule as one of many princes in Gwynedd Uwch Conwy, the territory of Gwynedd west of the River Conwy which he was forced by Henry III of England to share with his brothers Owain Goch ap Gruffudd and later Dafydd ap Gruffudd by the terms of the punitive treaty forced upon them in 1247. After achieving victory over his brothers in 1255, Llywelyn went on to reconquer the areas of Gwynedd occupied by England (the Perfeddwlad and others). In 1257, he reconquered large areas of mid-Wales from the English Marcher Lords, and secured his position by allying with Simon de Montfort, 6th Earl of Leicester against Henry III, though he took no part in the battles which led to the earl's downfall. By the terms of the Treaty of Montgomery between England and Wales in 1267 Llywelyn was granted the title "Prince of Wales" for him to be allowed to keep the lands he had conquered as well as the homage of lesser Welsh princes in return for his own homage to the King of England and payment of the substantial fee of 24,000 marks payable in installments. Disputes between him, his brother Dafydd, and English lords bordering his own led to renewed conflict with England (now ruled by Edward I) in 1276. Following the Treaty of Aberconwy in 1277, Llywelyn was again confined to Gwynedd Uwch Conwy. He joined a revolt instigated by his brother Dafydd in 1282 in which he died in battle.

=== Dafydd ap Gruffudd 1282–83 ===
Dafydd assumed his elder brother's title in 1282 and led a brief period of continued resistance against England. He was captured and executed in 1283.

=== Government, administration and law ===
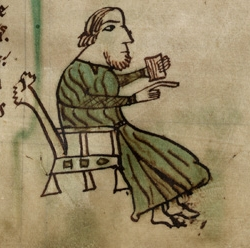
Drawing of a Welsh judge from the Peniarth 28 manuscript. (Note: The court judge in his chair, a lawbook in his hand.)

The political maturation of the principality's government fostered a more defined relationship between the prince and the people. Emphasis was placed on the territorial integrity of the principality, with the prince as lord of all the land, and other Welsh lords swearing fealty to the prince directly, a distinction with which the Prince of Wales paid yearly tribute to the King of England. By treaty, the principality was obliged to pay the kingdom large annual sums. Between 1267 and 1272 Wales made a total payment of £11,500, "proof of a growing money economy... and testimony of the effectiveness of the principality's financial administration," wrote historian Dr. John Davies. Additionally, modifications and amendments to the Law Codes of Hywel Dda encouraged the decline of the galanas (blood-fine) and the use of the jury system. The Aberffraw dynasty maintained vigorous diplomatic and domestic policies; and patronized the Church in Wales, particularly that of the Cistercian Order.

==== The princely court ====
At the end of the twelfth century, and beginning of the thirteenth century, Llywelyn ab Iorwerth (Llywelyn Fawr or Llywelyn the Great), built a royal home at Abergwyngregyn (known as Tŷ Hir, the Long House, in later documents) on the site of the subsequent manor house of Pen y Bryn. To the east was the newly endowed Cistercian Monastery of Aberconwy; to the west the cathedral city of Bangor. In 1211, King John of England brought an army across the river Conwy, and occupied the royal home for a brief period; his troops went on to burn Bangor. Llywelyn's wife, John's daughter Joan, also known as Joanna, negotiated between the two men, and John withdrew. Joan died at Abergwyngregyn in 1237; Dafydd ap Llywelyn died there in 1246; Eleanor de Montfort, Lady of Wales, wife of Llywelyn ap Gruffudd, died there on 19 June 1282, giving birth to a baby, Gwenllian of Wales.

=== Population, culture and society ===
The 13th-century Principality of Wales encompassed three-quarters of the surface area of modern Wales; "from Anglesey to Machen, from the outskirts of Chester to the outskirts of Cydweli," wrote Davies. By 1271, Prince Llywelyn II could claim a growing population of about 200,000 people or a little less than three-quarters of the total Welsh population. The population increase was common throughout Europe in the 13th century, but in Wales it was more pronounced. By Llywelyn II's reign, as much as 10 percent of the population were town-dwellers. Additionally, "unfree slaves... had long disappeared" from within the territory of the principality, wrote Davies. The increase in men allowed the prince to call on and field a far more substantial army.

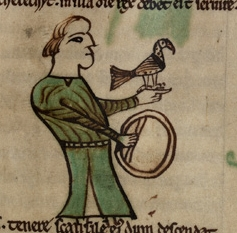
Drawing of a falconer from Peniarth 28 manuscript. Wales exported hawks. (Note: The hebogydd, falconer, a hawk or falcon on one hand and a perch in the other)

A more stable social and political environment provided by the Aberffraw administration allowed for the natural development of Welsh culture, particularly in literature, law, and religion. Tradition originating from The History of Gruffydd ap Cynan attributes Gruffydd I as reforming the orders of bards and musicians; Welsh literature demonstrated "vigor and a sense of commitment" as new ideas reached Wales, even in "the wake of the invaders", according to historian John Davies. Contacts with continental Europe "sharpened Welsh pride", wrote Davies in his History of Wales.

=== Economy and trade ===
The increase in the Welsh population, especially in the lands of the principality, allowed for a greater diversification of the economy. The Meirionnydd tax rolls give evidence to the thirty-seven various professions present in Meirionnydd directly before the conquest. Of these professions, there were eight goldsmiths, four bards (poets) by trade, 26 shoemakers, a doctor in Cynwyd, and a hotel keeper in Maentwrog, and 28 priests; two of whom were university graduates. Also present were a significant number of fishermen, administrators, professional men and craftsmen.

With the average temperature of Wales a degree or two higher than it is today, more Welsh lands were arable for agriculture, "a crucial bonus for a country like Wales," wrote the historian John Davies. Of significant importance for the principality included more developed trade routes, which allowed for the introduction of new energy sources such as the windmill, the fulling mill and the horse collar (which doubled the efficiency of horse-power).

The principality traded cattle, skins, cheese, timber, horses, wax, dogs, hawks, and fleeces, but also flannel (with the growth of fulling mills). Flannel was second only to cattle among the principality's exports. In exchange, the principality imported salt, wine, wheat, and other luxuries from London and Paris. But most importantly for the defence of the principality, iron and specialised weaponry were also imported. Welsh dependence on foreign imports was a tool that England used to wear down the principality during times of conflict between the two countries.

== 1284 to 1543: Annexation by the English crown ==
Principality of Wales after 1284 Under the Justiciar of North Wales Other direct rule lands March of Wales Marcher lords (incl. principality's tenants-in-chief in North Wales)

=== Establishment and governance ===
Between 1277 and 1283, Edward I of England conquered the territories of Llywelyn ap Gruffudd and the other last remaining native Welsh princes. The governance and constitutional position of the principality after its conquest was set out in the Statute of Rhuddlan of 1284. In the words of the statute, the principality was "annexed and united" to the English crown.

The principality's administration was overseen by the Prince of Wales's council comprising between 8 and 15 councillors sitting in London or, later, Ludlow in Shropshire. The council acted as the principality's final court of appeal. By 1476, the council, which became known as the Council of Wales and the Marches, began taking responsibility not only for the principality itself but its authority was extended over the whole of Wales.

The territory of the principality fell into two distinct areas: the lands under direct royal control and lands that Edward I had distributed by feudal grants.

For lands under royal control, the administration, under the Statute of Rhuddlan, was divided into two territories: North Wales based at Caernarfon and West Wales based at Carmarthen. The Statute organized the Principality into shire counties. Carmarthenshire and Cardiganshire were administered by the Justiciar of South Wales (or "of West Wales") at Carmarthen. In the North, the counties of Anglesey, Merionethshire, and Caernarfonshire were created under the control of Justiciar of North Wales and a provincial exchequer at Caernarfon, run by the Chamberlain of North Wales, who accounted for the revenues he collected to the Exchequer at Westminster. Under them were royal officials such as sheriffs, coroners, and bailiffs to collect taxes and administer justice. Another county, Flintshire, was created out of the lordships of Tegeingl, Hopedale and Maelor Saesneg, and was administered with the Palatinate of Cheshire by the Justiciar of Chester.

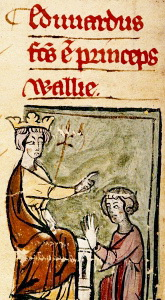
Edward I creating his son Edward of Caernarfon Prince of Wales in 1301 (early 14th-century manuscript)

The remainder of the principality comprised lands that Edward I had granted to supporters shortly after the completion of the conquest in 1284, and which, in practice, became Marcher lordships: for example, the Lordship of Denbigh granted to the Earl of Lincoln and the Lordship of Powys granted to Owain ap Gruffydd ap Gwenwynwyn, who became Owen de la Pole. These lands after 1301 were held as tenants-in-chief of the Principality of Wales, rather than from the Crown directly, but were, for all practical purposes, not part of the principality.

=== Law ===
The Statute of Rhuddlan also introduced English common law to the principality, albeit with some local variation. Criminal law became entirely based on common law: the statute stated that "in thefts, larcenies, burnings, murders, manslaughters and manifest and notorious robberies – we will that they shall use the laws of England". However, Welsh law continued to be used in civil cases such as land inheritance, contracts, sureties, and similar matters, though with changes, for example, illegitimate sons could no longer claim part of the inheritance, which Welsh law had allowed them to do. In 1301, this modified principality was bestowed on the English monarch's heir apparent and thereafter became the territorial endowment of the heir to the throne.

There were few attempts by the English parliament to legislate in Wales and the lands of the principality remained subject to laws enacted by the king and his council. However, the king was prepared to allow Parliament to legislate in emergencies such as treason or rebellion. An example was the Penal Laws against Wales 1402 (Note: Examples of the restrictions are: Englishman shall not be convict[ed] by Welshman in Wales (this included Welsh through marriage); Against wasters minstrels etc. in Wales ("Item, to eschew many diseases and mischiefs, which have happened before this time in the land of Wales…: it is ordained and stablished that no waster, rhymer, minstrel nor vagabond be in any wise sustained in the land of Wales…"); Against congregations in Wales (public meetings were banned); Welshmen shall not be armed ("no Welshman be armed nor bear defensible armour"); No victual or armour shall be carried into Wales (it was banned for an Englishman to carry armour to Wales or a Welshman to possess such items of battle); Welshmen shall not have castles etc (only the castle's from the time of Edward I were allowed to be used); No Welshman shall bear office ("Justice, Chamberlain, Chancellor, Treasurer, Sheriff, Steward, Constable of Castle, Receiver, Escheator, Coroner, nor Chief Forester nor any other Officer, nor Keeper of the Records, nor Lieutenant in any of the said Offices in no part of Wales, nor of the Council of any English lord…").) enacted to contain the Glyndŵr Rising and which, inter alia, prohibited the Welsh from intermarrying with the English or owning land in England or the Welsh boroughs. Some Welshman who were loyal to the Principality successfully petitioned for exemption from the penal laws. An example was Rhys ap Thomas ap Dafydd of Carmarthenshire who was a royal official in the southern part of the principality.

=== Castles, towns and colonisation ===
Edward's main concern following the conquest was to ensure the military security of his new territories and the stone castle was to be the primary means for achieving this. Under the supervision of James of Saint George, Edward's master-builder, a series of imposing castles was built, using a distinctive design and the most advanced defensive features of the day, to form a "ring of stone" around the northern part of the principality. Among the major buildings were the castles of Beaumaris, Caernarfon, Conwy and Harlech. Aside from their practical military role, the castles made a clear symbolic statement to the Welsh that the principality was subject to English rule on a permanent basis.

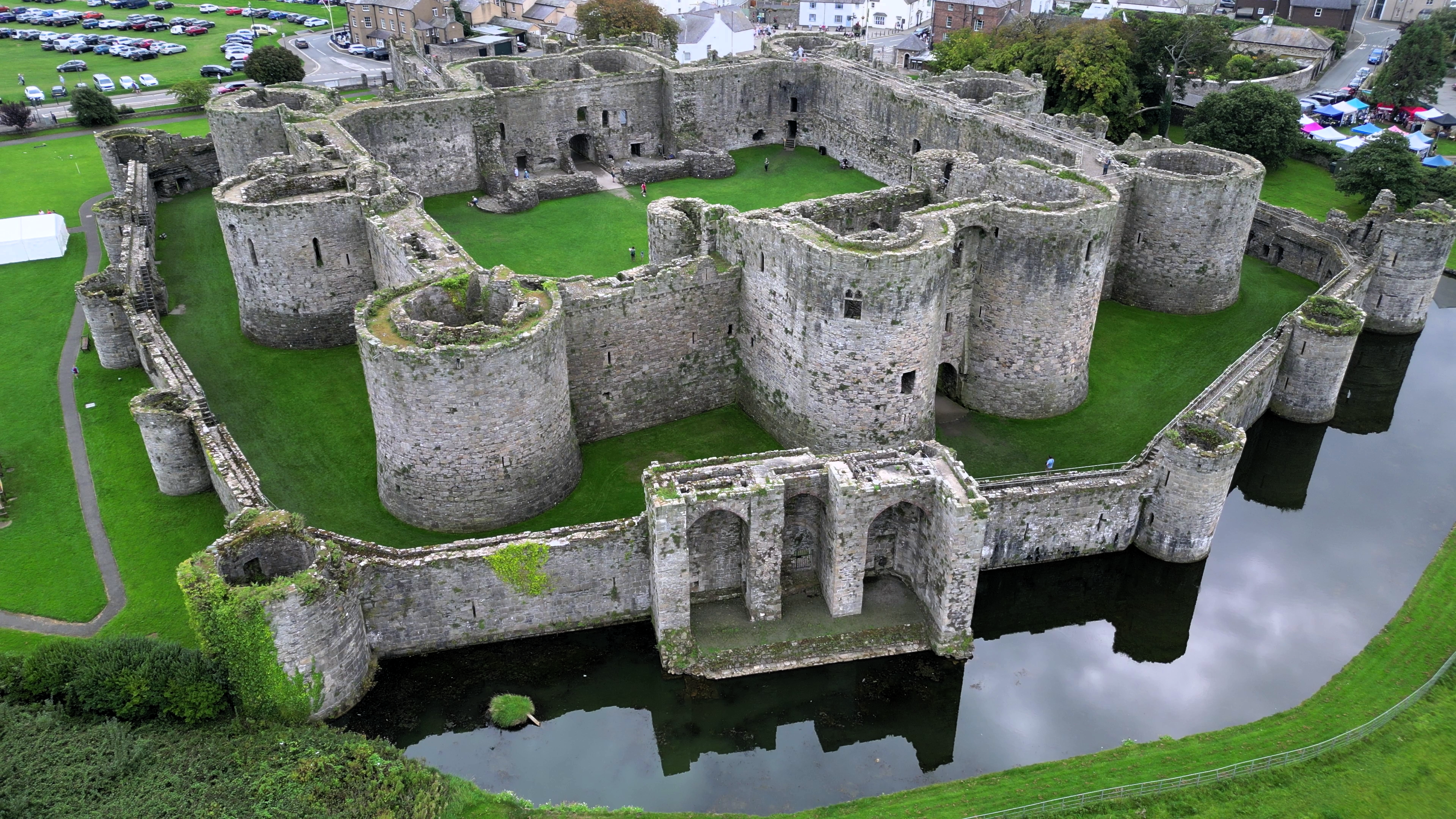
Beaumaris castle on Anglesey

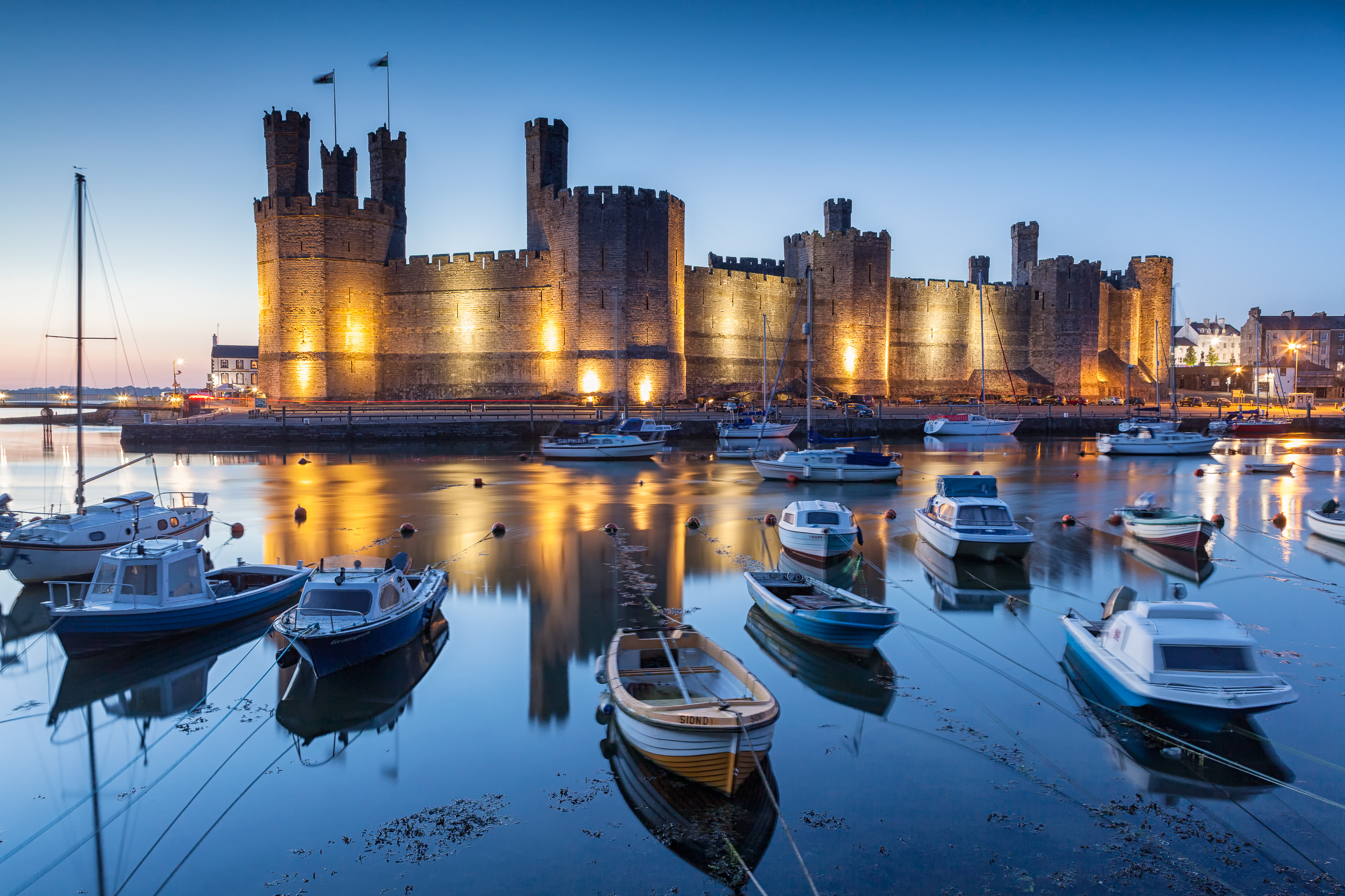
Caernarfon castle, Gwynedd

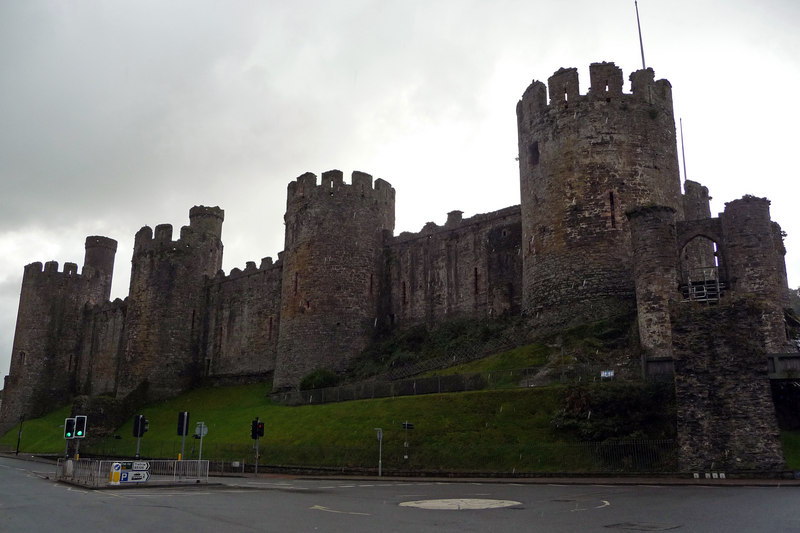
Conwy castle, north Wales

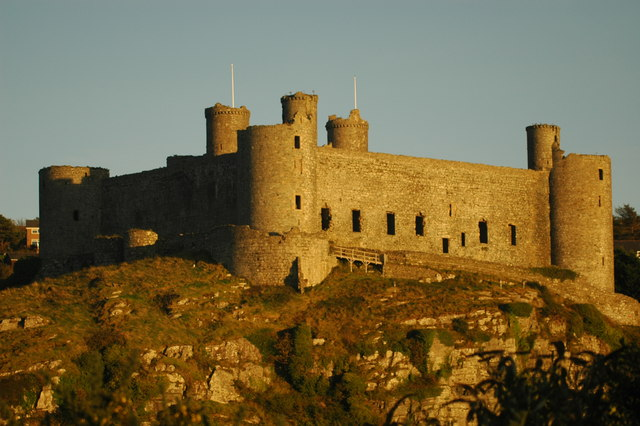
Harlech castle, north-west Wales.

Outside of urban areas, the principality retained its Welsh character. Unlike in some of the newly created Marcher lordships, such as Denbigh, there was little evidence of the successful colonisation of rural areas by English settlers. For the royal shires, Edward established a series of new towns, usually attached to one of his stone castles, which would be the focus of English settlement. These "plantation boroughs", often with the castle constable as town mayor, were populated by English burgesses and acted as a support for the royal military establishment as well as being an anglicizing influence. Examples include Flint, Aberystwyth, Beaumaris, Conwy and Caernarfon.

The boroughs were given economic rights over the surrounding Welsh rural areas and prospered as a result. For example, the burgesses of Caernarfon had a monopoly over trade within eight miles of the town. The burgesses of Carmarthen were given the right to raise taxes from the surrounding population to maintain their town walls. Royal ordinances initially prohibited the Welsh from becoming burgesses, owning land, or even residing in the "English" towns. The enforcement of these laws weakened over time and, although they were temporarily reinforced in 1402 by Henry IV's penal laws following the Welsh Revolt led by Owain Glyndŵr, they had largely been abandoned by the Tudor period. Even so, in the 14th century in particular, the privileged "English" boroughs were a focus of intense Welsh resentment and the English burgesses continued to hold the Welsh in disdain and sought to maintain their own distinctiveness and settlers' rights.

Nevertheless, there is ample evidence of the gradual assimilation of the two groups, not least through intermarriage. A town such as Aberystwyth had become entirely Welsh in character by the end of the medieval period. At the time of the union with England in the 16th century, English migrant ethnic origin ceased to have the same significance, although upward mobility was linked to anglicisation and use of the English language. Nevertheless, as late as 1532, a group of burgesses from Caernarfon bitterly complained that some of their number had let properties in the town to "foreigners", all of whom had Welsh names.

=== Plantagenet and Tudor princes ===
From 1301, the Plantagenet (and later, Tudor) English kings gave their heir apparent, if he was the king's son or grandson, the lands and title of "Prince of Wales". The one exception was Edward II's son, Edward of Windsor, who later became Edward III. Upon the heir's accession to the throne, the lands and title merged in the Crown.

The first "English" Prince of Wales was Edward I's son, Edward of Caernarfon. A late 16th-century story claimed that Edward I gave him the title following his declaration to the Welsh that there would be a Prince of Wales "that was borne in Wales and could speake never a word of English": Edward was born at Caernarfon Castle and, in common with the rest of the English ruling elite, spoke French. However, there seems to be no basis for the story. On 7 February 1301, the king granted to Edward all the lands under royal control in Wales, mainly the territory of the former Principality. Although the documents granting the land made no reference to the title "Prince of Wales", it seems likely that Edward was invested with it at the same time, since, within a month of the grant, he was referred to as the "Prince of Wales" in official documents.

Arms of the Black Prince, Prince of Wales 1343–1376. The arms are the origin of the modern insignia of the Prince of Wales's feathers

The following received the title while the Principality was in existence:

- Edward of Caernarfon, later Edward II (Prince from 1301 until he became King in 1307)
- Edward of Woodstock, the Black Prince (Prince from 1343 to his death in 1376)
- Richard of Bordeaux, later Richard II (Prince from 1376 until he became King in 1377)
- Henry of Monmouth, later Henry V (Prince from 1399 until he became King in 1413)
- Edward of Westminster (Prince from 1454 until his death in 1471)
- Edward of the Sanctuary, later Edward V (Prince from 1471 until he became King in 1483)
- Edward of Middleham (Prince from 1483 to his death in 1484)
- Arthur Tudor (Prince from 1489 to his death in 1502)
- Henry Tudor, later Henry VIII (Prince from 1504 until he became King in 1509)
- Edward Tudor, later Edward VI (Prince from 1537 until he became King in 1547, the last Prince of Wales created prior to 1542)

=== Welsh revolts ===
Madog ap Llywelyn led a Welsh revolt in 1294–95 against English rule in Wales, and was proclaimed "Prince of Wales".

Owain Lawgoch, a great-nephew of Llywelyn ap Gruffudd and Dafydd ap Gruffudd, claimed the title in exile in France and supporters revolted in his name across Wales between 1372 and 1378. He was assassinated before being able to return to Wales to lead them.

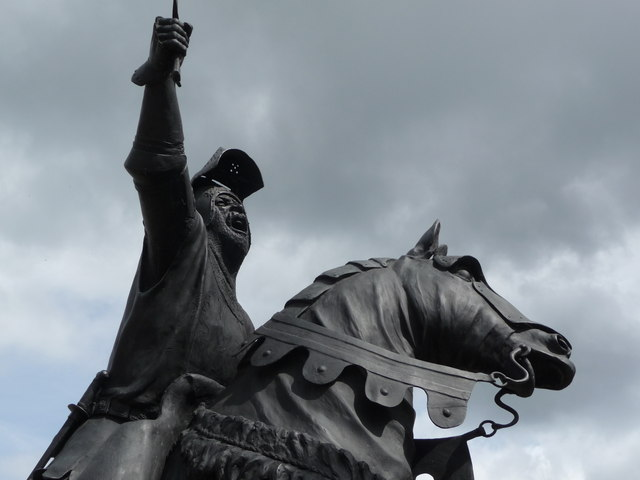
Owain Glyndwr statue, Corwen

Banner of Owain Glyndŵr. (Note: A European Armourial; Historic Heraldry of Britain; Heraldry, Sources, Symbols and Meanings; Military Modelling; Knights in Armour.)

Owain Glyndŵr was crowned at Machynlleth in 1404 during a revolt against Henry IV of England. He claimed descent from Rhodri Mawr through the House of Powys Fadog. He went on to establish diplomatic relations with foreign powers and liberated Wales from English rule. He was ultimately unsuccessful and was driven to the mountains where he led a guerrilla war. When and where he died is not known, but it is believed he died disguised as a friar in the company of his daughter, Alys, at Monnington Straddle in Herefordshire.

=== Laws in Wales Acts 1535 and 1542 ===
The Principality ceased to exist as a legal entity with the passing by English parliament of the Laws in Wales Acts 1535 and 1542, without any representation from Wales. The act stated that Wales was already 'incorporated, annexed, united, and subjecte to and under the imperialle Crown of this Realme as a very member…of the same’. (Note: The 1536 act, according to Dr John Davies unified the principality of Wales and the March of Wales.) The law of England was applied as the only law in Wales, Justice of the peace administered the newly created counties and the act also made English the only language of the courts in Wales, and Wales gained a representation in English parliament. However, those using the Welsh language would not be able to take up office in the territories of the king of England. There were four Court of Great Sessions in Wales based on the three of the counties, e.g. north, east, south, west. The implementation of the act was delayed until a more detailed act was used in 1543.

== After 1543: union with England ==
=== Later administration ===
The Encyclopaedia of Wales notes that the Council of Wales and the Marches was created by Edward IV in 1471 as a household institution to manage the Prince of Wales's lands and finances. In 1473 it was enlarged and given the additional duty of maintaining law and order in the Principality and the Marches of Wales. Its meetings appear to have been intermittent, but it was revived by Henry VII for his heir, Prince Arthur. The Council was placed on a statutory basis in 1543 and played a central role in co-ordinating law and administration. The council at Ludlow was to have full administrative and legal powers until it declined in the early 17th century and was abolished by Parliament in 1641. It was revived at the Restoration before being finally abolished in 1689.

From 1689 to 1948 there was no differentiation between England's government and Wales's government. All laws relating to England included Wales and Wales was considered by the British Government as an indivisible part of England within the United Kingdom. The first piece of legislation to relate specifically to Wales was the Sunday Closing (Wales) Act 1881. A further exception was the Welsh Church Act 1914, which disestablished the Church in Wales (which had formerly been part of the Church of England) in 1920.

In 1948 the practice was established that all laws passed in the Parliament of the United Kingdom were designated as applicable to either "England and Wales", "Northern Ireland" or "Scotland", thus returning a legal identity to Wales which had not existed for hundreds of years following the Act of Union with Scotland in 1707. Also in 1948 a new Council for Wales was established as a parliamentary committee. In 1964 the Welsh Office was established, based in London, to oversee and recommend improvements to the application of laws in Wales. This situation would continue until the devolution of government in Wales and the establishment of the autonomous National Assembly for Wales in 1998.

=== Other uses of the term ===
Although no principality has ever been created that covers Wales as a whole, the term "Principality" has been occasionally used since the sixteenth century as a synonym for Wales. For instance, the first atlas of Wales, by Thomas Taylor in 1718, was titled The Principality of Wales exactly described ..., and the term is still used by such publications as Burke's Landed Gentry. Publications such as Lewis's A Topographical Dictionary of Wales, and Welsh newspapers in the 19th century commonly used the term.

In modern times, however, The Guardian style guide advises writers to "avoid the word 'principality'" in relation to Wales. The International Organization for Standardization (ISO) has defined Wales as a "country" rather than a "principality" since 2011, following a recommendation by the British Standards Institute and the Welsh Government.

The use of the term to refer to the territory of Wales should be distinguished from its use to refer to the title of Prince of Wales, which has been traditionally granted (together with the title Duke of Cornwall and various Scottish titles) to the heir apparent of the reigning British monarch. It confers no responsibility for government in Wales, and has no constitutional meaning. Plaid Cymru are in favour of scrapping the title altogether. The Honours of the Principality of Wales are the Crown Jewels used at the investiture of Princes of Wales.
