= Tomas ap Rhodri =

Welsh landowner (c. 1300 – c. 1363)

Tomas ap Rhodri or Thomas Rothery (c. 1300 – c. 1363) was the only known son of Rhodri ap Gruffudd, the youngest son of Prince Gruffydd ap Llywelyn Fawr and younger brother to both Llywelyn ap Gruffudd and Dafydd ap Gruffydd. After the deaths of Llywelyn, Dafydd, and their eldest brother Owain the Red between 1282 and 1283, Rhodri became the most senior member of the Aberffraw Dynasty to retain his liberty because he had sold his rights of succession to his brother Llywelyn around 1270 before he had had any children of his own. Tomas did not make any claim himself to the throne of Gwynedd.

Tomas was born in England sometime around 1300 and is thought to have died in 1363. His sister, Katherine, married into the former ruling family of Powys Wenwynwyn, now Earls of Powis. Tomas inherited his father's lands in Cheshire and Surrey (Tatfield). However, he parted from his Cheshire estates in favour of lands at Bidfield in Gloucestershire and Dinas in Mechain Is Coed (Powys). This is not the only evidence of an enduring interest in re-establishing a base in Wales because he appears to have made an unsuccessful claim on the Lordship of Llŷn on the basis that he was the closest male heir of Owain Goch.

He married one Cecilia and was the father of Owain ap Tomas—more commonly known as Owain Lawgoch—who in 1369 proclaimed himself Prince of Wales. Owain was assassinated in 1378.
