= Battle of Bryn Derwin =

1255 Battle in Wales

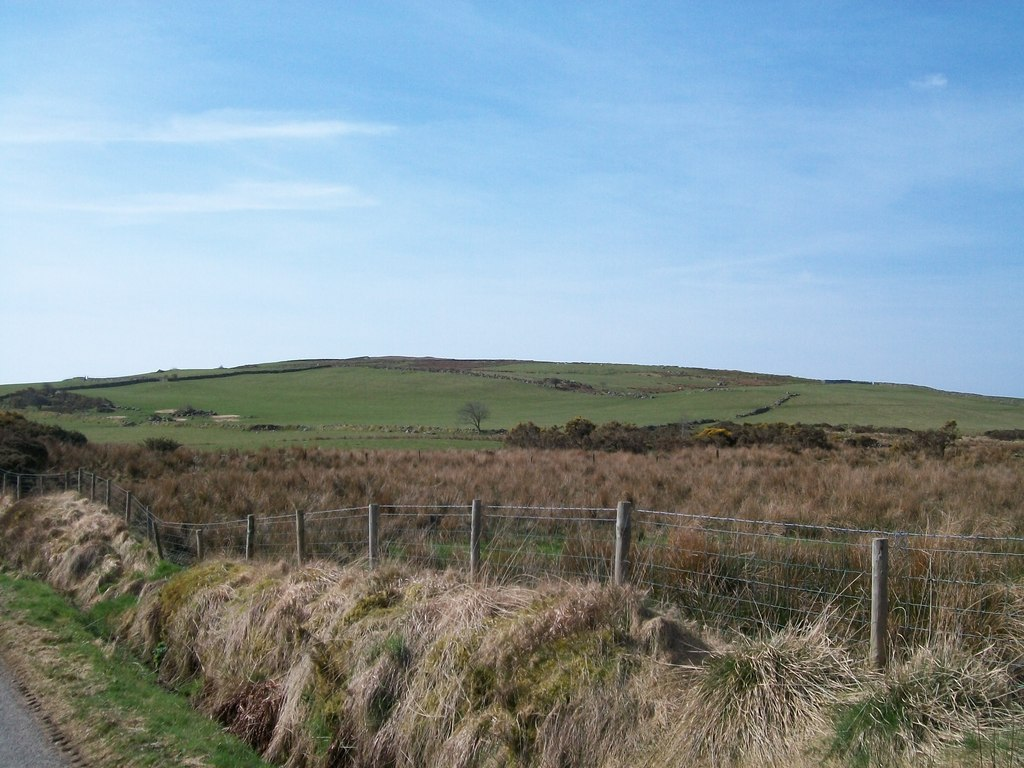
- The site of the battle today
Date	June 1255
Location	Bwlch Dau Fynydd, Bwlch-derwin, Llŷn 52°59′20.82″N 4°17′44.52″W
Result	Victory for Llywelyn ap Gruffudd
Territorial changes	Llywelyn ap Gruffudd takes possession of the entirety of Gwynedd Uwch Conwy

Belligerents
Llywelyn ap Gruffudd	Owain Goch ap Gruffudd: Dafydd ap Gruffudd
- Location of the battle in Eifionydd

The Battle of Bryn Derwin was fought at Bwlch-derwin in Eifionydd, Gwynedd on June 1255, between Llywelyn ap Gruffudd and his brothers, Dafydd ap Gruffudd and Owain Goch ap Gruffydd.

Llywelyn had ruled over a truncated Kingdom of Gwynedd jointly with Owain since the death of the previous Prince of Wales, Dafydd ap Llywelyn, in 1246, having agreed in the Treaty of Woodstock to split Gwynedd west of the Conwy, but relations between the two men apparently deteriorated in the early 1250s.

The battle lasted for no more than an hour, and resulted in a victory for Llywelyn; Dafydd and Owain were both imprisoned. Dafydd was soon released and went on to play a central role in the royal government of Gwynedd until his defection and subsequent removal to England in the mid-1260s. Llywelyn reluctantly released Owain in 1277 under the terms of the Treaty of Aberconwy, after some 20 years of captivity.

Upon being released, Owain retired to his estate in north-west Wales and never again mounted a serious challenge to his brother Llywelyn's rule. He is thought to have died c. 1282.

Subsequent military campaigns by Llywelyn in 1257 and 1260 recovered much lost Welsh territory, and his undisputed leadership within Wales ushered in a period of stability that would last until the mid-1270s.

== Sources ==
- J. B. Smith, Llywelyn ap Gruffudd: Prince of Wales (Cardiff, 1998).
