= Hywel Coetmor =

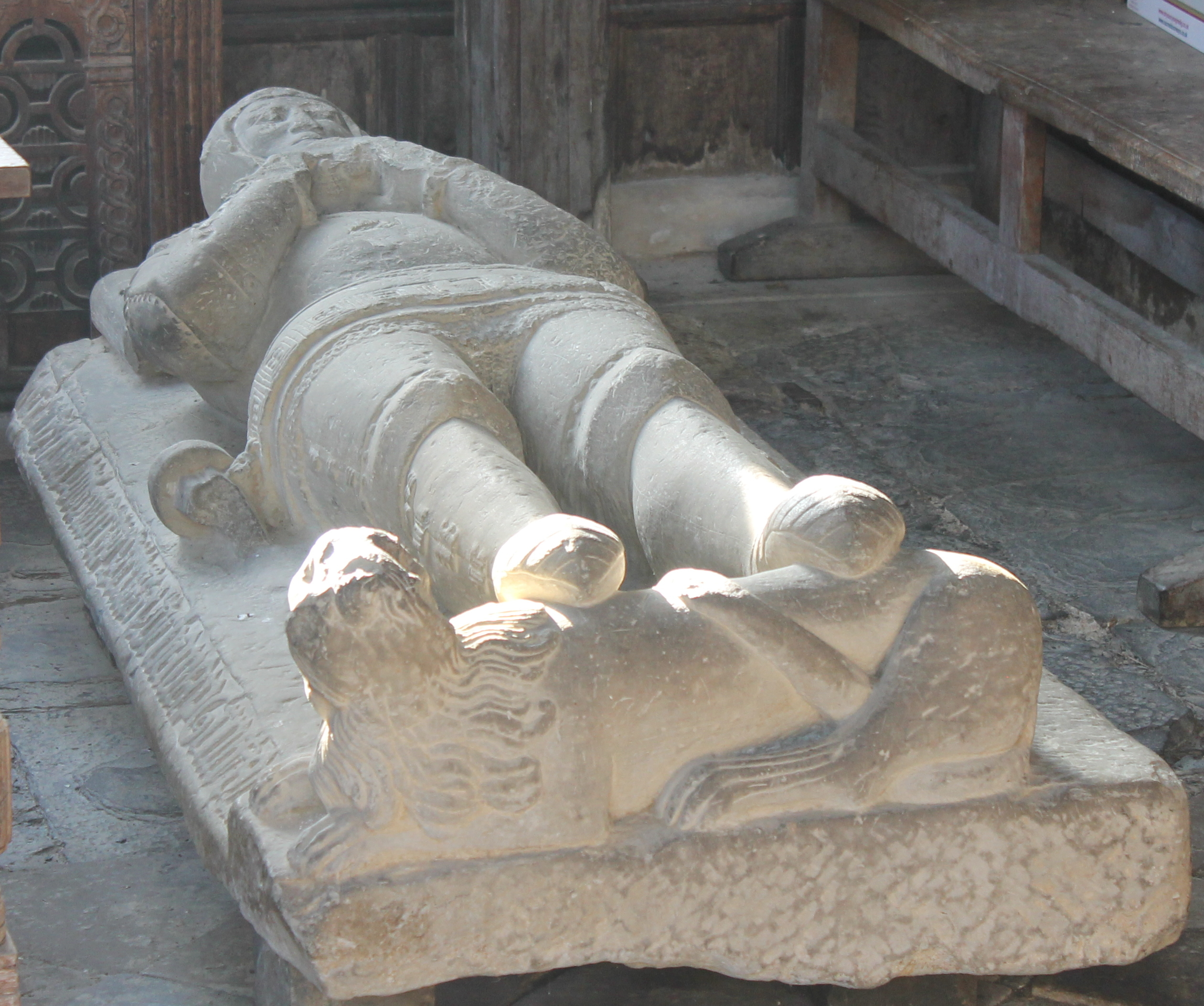
Recumbent effigy of Hywel Coetmor in St Grwst's Church Llanrwst, Conway.

Hywel Coetmor (died c. 1440) was a Welsh knight who played a leading part in Prince Owain Glyndŵr's Welsh rebellion between 1400 and c. 1415 against the Kingdom of England. His brother was Rhys Gethin, who was one of Glyndŵr's leading generals.

== Family ==
Hywel Coetmor was a nobleman from Nant Conwy, a commote in the south of what is now the county of Conwy. He married Gwenllian, a daughter of Rhys ap Robert (d. 1377), a prominent nobleman who had supported Owain Lawgoch, a claimant to the title of Prince of Gwynedd and of Wales.

Hywel claimed to be a descendant of Prince Llywelyn the Great and to therefore belong to the royal dynasty of the kingdom of Gwynedd. His father was Gruffudd Fychan ap Gruffudd ap Dafydd Goch ap Dafydd ap Gruffudd ap Llywelyn Fawr. His brother Rhys Gethin, was one of Owain Glyndŵr's chief captains.

== Glyndŵr rebellion ==
In 1390 an English clergyman was appointed to the parish priesthood of Llanrwst by the Archbishop of Canterbury. The response of the local nobility was to force the monolingual Englishman to leave in a hurry and steal his property. Hywel Coetmor and his brother Rhys Gethin were two of the leaders of the rebellion.

When the Glyndŵr rebellion broke out in 1400, Owain was joined by Hywel and Rhys. Rhys was killed in battle in 1405 but Hywel appears to have received a pardon at the end of the rebellion, and is recorded as one of the captains in the army of Henry V of England at the Battle of Agincourt in 1415, one of the key battles of the Hundred Years' War in France.

Hywel was the first to build a mansion on the site of Plas Gwydir; it was later sold by his son, Dafydd ap Hywel Coetmor, to the Wynn family. He was also prominent as a patron saint of poets.

== Legacy ==
A cywydd praise poem was written to him by poet Ieuan Llwyd Brydydd and an unknown poet proclaims him as "Hywel Cymro, o hil Cymry," who is of the lineage of Llywelyn (Fawr), and refers to him as "cur y Saeson" in a couplet referring to Owain Glyn Dŵr.

Hywel Coetmor was buried in St Grwst's Church at Llanrwst where he is commemorated by an effigy of him in armour.
