= Rhodri ap Gruffudd =

Prince of the Kingdom of Gwynedd (c. 1230–c. 1315)

- Born: c. 1230–1235
- Died: c. 1315
- Issue: Tomas ap Rhodri
- House: Aberffraw
- Father: Gruffudd ap Llywelyn ab Iorwerth
- Mother: Senana ferch Caradog

Rhodri ap Gruffudd (or Prince Rhodri or Roderick Fitz Griffin) (c. 1230 – c. 1315) was the third or fourth son of Gruffydd ap Llywelyn Fawr. He was the younger brother of both Llywelyn ap Gruffudd of Gwynedd, Prince of Wales) and of Owain Goch ap Gruffydd. He was probably the younger brother of Dafydd ap Gruffydd of Gwynedd but may have been the older as there are no accurate records of their birth dates.

== History ==
Rhodri was born in the early 1230s. His father was Gruffydd ap Llywelyn, the illegitimate but eldest son of Llywelyn the Great, and his mother was Senena ferch Caradog. Little is known about his early life except that on his grandfather's death in 1240 his uncle Dafydd ap Llywelyn (his father's younger, but legitimate, half brother) inherited the throne and immediately imprisoned his father, thus disinheriting him. Gruffudd was subsequently relinquished by Dafydd under the terms of the Treaty of Gwerneigron following Henry III's invasion of 1241, and taken to London as a hostage where he died in 1244 during a failed attempt to escape from the Tower of London. Also in 1241, Rhodri along with his brother Dafydd ap Gruffydd were sent as hostages to King Henry. Dafydd ap Llywelyn seized the opportunity to wage war against Henry, defeating him in battle in the summer of 1245 during Henry's second invasion of Wales.

In February 1246 Dafydd died without legitimate male heirs, and the throne was inherited under Welsh Law by the four sons of the now dead Gruffudd. A massive struggle ensued between them all but by the 1250s Rhodri's elder brother Llywelyn had consolidated his position as prince and successfully excluded the other siblings from power. Rhodri alone appears to have avoided getting involved in the fighting and by 1272 had agreed to sell his inheritance rights to Llywelyn. It is possible that to enforce this sale that he became Llywelyn's Penteulu, which under Welsh law would mean that he took himself out of the line of succession.

By 1282 (and possibly even earlier) Rhodri had come into the possession of the manor of Bidfield in Gloucestershire. He married into a noble Cheshire family and acquired property there through his wife, Beatrice de Malpas.

Some sources claim that on her death he married one Catherine and by c. 1309 had acquired the manor of Tatsfield in Surrey.

Rhodri died c. 1315. As the only surviving brother of Llywelyn ap Gruffudd after 1283 he would have been regarded by many as a legitimate claimant to the throne of Gwynedd, and therefore also to the title Prince of Wales. He is reputed to have had at least one son, Thomas ap Rhodri (by Catherine), who was the father to Owain Lawgoch and a daughter, Katherine, who married into the De La Pole family.

== Tatsfield Manor ==
Academic research by Professor Anthony Carr indicated that the manor of Tatsfield in Surrey was in the possession of Rhodri ap Gruffudd and his descendants during the 14th century. Rhodri’s son, Thomas ap Rhodri, and his grandson, Owain ap Thomas (Owain Lawgoch), may have been born in Tatsfield. Owain Lawgoch eventually became one of France’s leading mercenary captains fighting against the English during the 1360s and 1370s and was eventually assassinated in 1378 under the orders of the English Crown because of the threat he presented to the political stability of Wales after he declared himself Prince of Wales.

Documentary sources suggested Tatsfield manor house was demolished in 1801. However, the investigations revealed that Thomas had borrowed money to build a new house during the 1320s and that his house and associated complex had been systematically dismantled at the end of the 14th century, most probably under the orders of the English Crown and in a very similar fashion to the way such llys or palace complexes were removed by Edward I in Wales.

== Bibliography ==
- "The end of The House of Gwynedd: Excavation of a Medieval Welsh Manor Complex in Tatsfield, Surrey" by Spencer Smith

Preceded by Dafydd ap Gruffydd	Head of the House of Aberffraw	Succeeded by [Disputed]
