= Bwlch-derwin =

Village in Gwynedd, Wales

Coordinates: 52°59′55″N 4°17′52″W

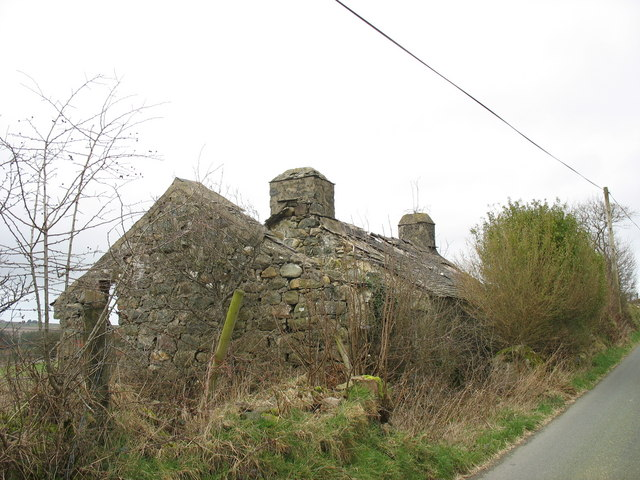
- Ruined cottage on the Bwlch-derwin road

- Location within Gwynedd
- Community: Dolbenmaen
- Principal area: Gwynedd
- Country: Wales
- Sovereign state: United Kingdom
- UK Parliament: Dwyfor Meirionnydd
- Senedd Cymru – Welsh Parliament: Gwynedd Maldwyn

Bwlch-derwin is a village in the community of Dolbenmaen, in the county of Gwynedd, Wales. Historically in Caernarfonshire, the village is situated within Snowdonia.

== History ==
Bwlch-derwin is known as a recognised battlefield site for the Battle of Bryn Derwin, where Llywelyn ap Gruffudd battled his two brothers for complete control of the Kingdom of Gwynedd in June 1255. It is a known site of archaeological interest. The local forests have reportedly been used as an illegal dump site.

== Governance ==
Bwlch-derwin is part of the local authority of Gwynedd Council.

== See also ==
- Lists of places in Wales
