= Llywelyn ap Gruffudd =

Prince of Gwynedd from 1255 to 1282

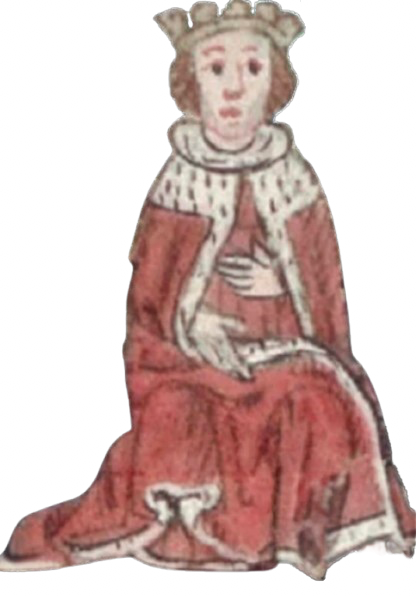
- Llywelyn at the Parliament of Edward I, from Wriothesley's garter book (c. 1530)

Prince of Gwynedd
- Reign: June 1255 – 11 December 1282
- Predecessor: Dafydd ap Llywelyn
- Successor: Dafydd ap Gruffudd
- Disteiniaid: See list: Gruffudd ab Ednyfed Fychan (c. 1247 – c. 1256) Goronwy ab Ednyfed Fychan (c. 1256 – 1268) Tudur ab Ednyfed Fychan (1268 – c. 1281) Dafydd ab Einion Fychan (c. 1281 – 1282)

Prince of Wales
- Pretence: 18 March 1258 – 29 September 1267
- Reign: 29 September 1267 – 11 December 1282
- Predecessor: Dafydd ap Llywelyn
- Successor: Dafydd ap Gruffudd
- Died: 11 December 1282; Cilmeri, Builth, Wales
- Burial: December 1282; Cwmhir Abbey, Maelienydd, Wales
- Spouse: Eleanor de Montfort
- Issue: Gwenllian ferch Llywelyn; Madog ap Llywelyn (ill.)
- Dynasty: Second Dynasty of Gwynedd
- Father: Gruffudd ap Llywelyn
- Mother: Senana ferch Caradog
- Military career
- Conflicts: Barons' Crusade; Anglo-Welsh wars Conquest of Wales by Edward I Battle of Bryn Derwin (1255); Battle of Moel-y-don (1282); Battle of Orewin Bridge † (1282)

Llywelyn ap Gruffudd (Note: Welsh pronunciation: [ˈɬəu̯ˈɛlɨ̞n ap ˈɡrɨ̞fɨ̞ð]; archaically known as Llywelyn II.) (died 11 December 1282) or Llywelyn the Last (Note: Welsh: Llywelyn ein Llyw Olaf, lit. 'Llywelyn our Last Leader') was Prince of Gwynedd from 1255 to 1282. After successful campaigns across Wales in 1257, Llywelyn proclaimed himself Prince of Wales in 1258, and was recognised as such by Henry III of England in 1267 as part of the Treaty of Montgomery. He remained in this position until his death in an ambush at Cilmeri in 1282, one of the final events in Edward I’s conquest of Wales.

== Genealogy and early life ==
Llywelyn was the second of the four sons of Gruffudd ap Llywelyn ap Iorwerth, the eldest son of Llywelyn ab Iorwerth, and Senana ferch Caradog, the daughter of Caradoc ap Thomas ap Rhodri, Lord of Anglesey.

The eldest was Owain Goch ap Gruffudd and there were two younger brothers, Dafydd ap Gruffydd and Rhodri ap Gruffudd. He is first heard of holding lands in the Vale of Clwyd around 1244.

Following his grandfather's death in 1240, Llywelyn's uncle, Dafydd ap Llywelyn (who was Llywelyn the Great's eldest legitimate son), succeeded him as ruler of Gwynedd. At this time, Llywelyn went on crusade with Richard of Cornwall, brother of Henry III of England.

Llywelyn's father, Gruffudd (who was Llywelyn's eldest son but illegitimate), and his brother, Owain, were initially kept prisoner by Dafydd, then transferred into the custody of King Henry III of England. Gruffudd died in 1244 from a fall while trying to escape from his cell at the top of the Tower of London. The window from which he attempted to escape the Tower was bricked up and can still be seen to this day. As King Henry could no longer use Gruffudd against him, war broke out between Dafydd II and King Henry in 1245. Llywelyn supported his uncle in the savage fighting that followed. Owain, meanwhile, was freed by Henry III after his father's death and was given a portion of Snowdonia (Eryri) by Henry at the treaty of Woodstock in 1247.

== Early reign ==
=== Gwynedd ===
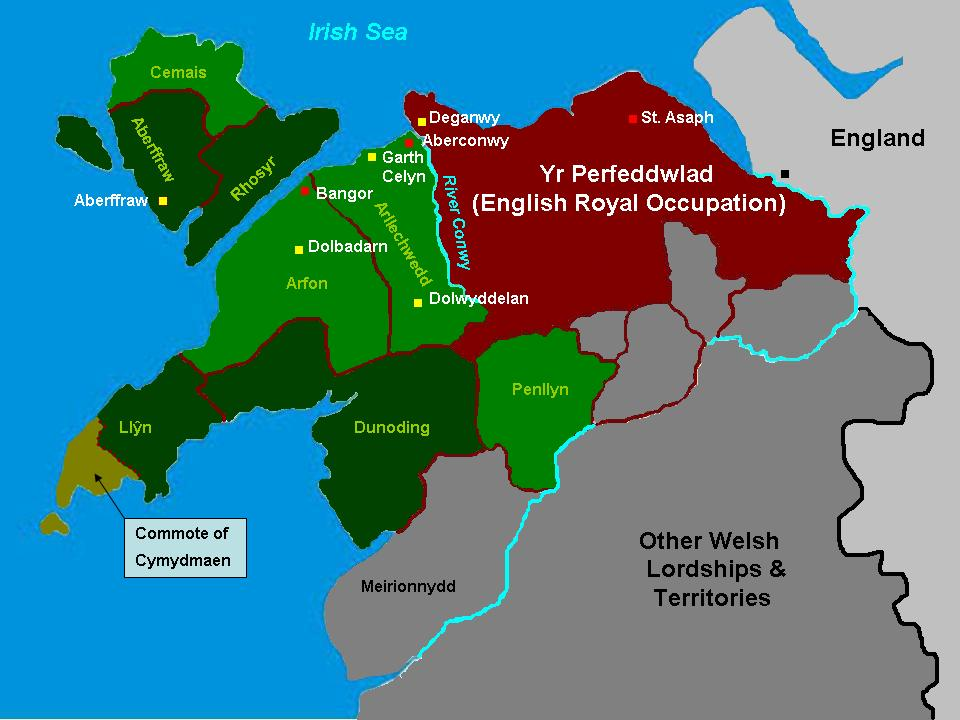
North Wales division 1247. (Note: Division of Kingdom of Gwynedd in 1247 following the succession of the brothers Owain Goch ap Gruffudd (whose lands are shown in dark green) and Llywelyn ap Gruffudd (light green). The commote of Cymydmaen (gold) was granted to Dafydd ap Gruffudd by Owain when he reached majority in 1252 (Source: J. Beverley Smith))

Llywelyn and Owain came to terms with King Henry III and in 1247 signed the Treaty of Woodstock at Woodstock Palace. The terms they were forced to accept restricted them to the west of Conwy (Gwynedd Uwch Conwy) around Snowdonia and Anglesey, which was divided between them. The other half of Gwynedd east of Conwy known as the Perfeddwlad was taken over by King Henry.

When Dafydd ap Gruffydd came of age, King Henry accepted his homage and announced his intention to give him part of the already reduced Gwynedd. Llywelyn refused to accept this and Owain and Dafydd formed an alliance against him. This led to the Battle of Bryn Derwin in June 1255. Llywelyn defeated Owain and Dafydd and captured them, thereby becoming the sole ruler of Gwynedd Uwch Conwy. Llywelyn now looked to expand his area of control. The population of Gwynedd Is Conwy resented English rule. This area, also known as "Perfeddwlad" (meaning "middle land") had been given by King Henry to his son Edward and during the summer of 1256, he visited the area but failed to deal with grievances against the rule of his officers. An appeal was made to Llywelyn, who, that November, crossed the River Conwy with an army, accompanied by his brother, Dafydd, whom he had released from prison. By early December, Llywelyn controlled all of Gwynedd Is Conwy, apart from the royal castle at Dyserth, as a reward for his support and dispossessing his brother-in-law, Rhys Fychan, who supported the king. An English army led by Stephen Bauzan invaded to try to restore Rhys Fychan but was decisively defeated by Welsh forces at the Battle of Cadfan in June 1257, with Rhys having previously slipped away to make his peace with Llywelyn.

=== All of Wales ===
During 1257, Llywelyn aggressively pursued his interests and gained control of lands in Gwrtheyrnion, driving out his cousin, the Anglo-Norman, Roger Mortimer. Then to Powys, which affected his fellow Welshman, Gwenwynwyn, and Deheubarth in South Wales, helping his kin against Norman control going as far as the Bristol Channel, leaving a trail of destruction during the time of Lent. Despite liberating his fellow Welsh folk, some would return to siding with the English upon his departure. The English retaliated by mobilising a force from Scotland to Deganwy in Wales but did not cross into Conwy, which was officially Llywelyn's Welsh territory. Henry III waited for an Irish naval force to attack on land from the west to corner Llywelyn, however, his force never arrived. The acts of aggression were followed by a peace truce for 1258, of which the Marcher Lords, did not completely abide by.

The leader of Deheubarth, Rhys Fychan now accepted Llywelyn as overlord, but this caused problems for Llywelyn, as Rhys's lands had already been given to Maredudd. Llywelyn restored his lands to Rhys, but the king's envoys approached Maredudd and offered him Rhys's lands if he would change sides. Maredudd paid homage to Henry in late 1257. After the betrayal, in 1259, Llywelyn jailed Maredudd until Christmas in Criccieth Castle. Maredudd was released only for him to surrender a son as hostage, it was then Dinefwr became a vassal kingdom of Gwynedd.

In early 1258, Llywelyn was using the title Prince of Wales, first used in an agreement between Llywelyn and his supporters and the Scottish nobility associated with the Comyn family. The English Crown refused to recognise this title however, and, in 1263, Llywelyn's brother, Dafydd was hostile against the Prince and submitted himself to King Henry.

Then in January 1260, Llywelyn pursued his interests internally by dislodging Roger Mortimer of Buellt. This would be an act of war which would be followed by an English decree which was summoned in Oxford on 1 August. Armies assembled at Shrewsbury and Chester with the sole purpose of removing Llywelyn from power. However, the English could not come to an agreement in government over the matter, and a truce was enacted again for a further 2 years. After 2 years the English continued castle building which caused a revolt from the Welsh, who in turn requested and were assisted by Llywelyn in defending their lands in Maelienydd. After, Llywelyn continued his expansion into South Wales to the Lordship of Brecon, where he received fealty from the Welsh who too ousted their Anglo-Norman Marcher Lord Mortimer. This success brought him to the attention of the Montfort family, which would start a new era for Gwynedd and Llywelyn. The change in territory forced Edward I to return to Wales for the first time since 1254.

On 12 December 1263, in the commote of Ystumanner, Gruffydd ap Gwenwynwyn (Mathrafal, Powys Wenwynwyn) did homage and swore fealty to Llywelyn. In return he was made a vassal lord and the lands taken from him by Llywelyn about six years earlier were restored to him.

== Supremacy in Wales ==
Wales after the Treaty of Montgomery of 1267: Gwynedd, Llywelyn ap Gruffudd's principality Territories conquered by Llywelyn ap Gruffudd Territories of Llywelyn's vassals Lordships of the Marcher barons Lordships of the King of England Kingdom of England

Llywelyn's interests were now not solely excluded to Wales. In England, Simon de Montfort (the Younger) defeated the king's supporters at the Battle of Lewes in 1264 (Second Barons' War), capturing the king and Lord Edward. Llywelyn began negotiations with de Montfort, and in 1265, offered him 25,000 marks in exchange for a permanent peace, 5,000 of which immediately and then 3,000 a year thereafter. The Treaty of Pipton, 22 June 1265, established an alliance between Llywelyn and de Montfort, although Pope Clement IV warned Llywelyn against allying himself with the excommunicated Montfort. As well as the rule of the whole Principality, Llywelyn was offered the castles of Maud, Hawarden, Ellesmere and Montgomery. Thus, Llywelyn's right to rule the Principality of Wales as the hereditary Prince of Wales would be acknowledged. De Montfort was to die at the Battle of Evesham in 1265, a battle in which Llywelyn took no part.

After Simon de Montfort's death, Llywelyn launched a campaign in order to rapidly gain a bargaining position before King Henry had fully recovered. In 1265, he routed the combined armies of Hamo le Strange and Maurice FitzGerald in North Wales. Llywelyn then moved on to Montgomery, and routed Roger Mortimer's army. With these victories and the backing of the papal legate, Ottobuono, Llywelyn opened negotiations with the king and was eventually recognised as Prince of Wales by King Henry in the Treaty of Montgomery in 1267. All of the Welsh princes submitted to Llywelyn II except for Maredudd ap Rhys Gryg. For this recognition he would have to pay the English crown 24,000 marks in installments, this agreement was confirmed by the papacy in Rome. If he wished, Llywelyn could purchase the homage of the one outstanding native prince – Maredudd ap Rhys of Deheubarth – for 5,000 marks. However, Llywelyn's territorial ambitions gradually made him unpopular with some minor Welsh leaders, particularly the princes of South Wales.

The Treaty of Montgomery marked the high point of Llywelyn's power. Problems began arising soon afterward, initially a dispute with Gilbert de Clare concerning the allegiance of a Welsh nobleman holding lands in Glamorgan. Gilbert built Caerphilly Castle in response to this. King Henry sent a bishop to take possession of the castle while the dispute was resolved but when Gilbert regained the castle by trickery, the king was unable to do anything about it.

Following the death of King Henry in late 1272, with the new King Edward I of England away from the kingdom on a crusade, the rule fell to three men. One of them, Roger Mortimer was one of Llywelyn's rivals in the marches. When Humphrey de Bohun tried to take back Brycheiniog, which was granted to Llywelyn by the Treaty of Montgomery, Mortimer supported de Bohun. Llywelyn was also finding it difficult to raise the annual sums required under the terms of this treaty and ceased making payments.

In early 1274, there was a plot by Llywelyn's brother, Dafydd, and Gruffydd ap Gwenwynwyn of Powys Wenwynwyn and his son, Owain, to kill Llywelyn. Dafydd was with Llywelyn at the time, and it was arranged that Owain would come with armed men on 2 February to carry out the assassination; however, he was prevented by a snowstorm. Llywelyn did not discover the full details of the plot until Owain confessed to the Bishop of Bangor. He said that the intention had been to make Dafydd prince of Gwynedd and that Dafydd would reward Gruffydd with lands. Dafydd and Gruffydd fled to England where they were maintained by the king and carried out raids on Llywelyn's lands, increasing Llywelyn's resentment. When Edward called Llywelyn to Chester in 1275 to pay homage, Llywelyn refused to attend.

Llywelyn also made an enemy of King Edward by continuing to ally himself with the family of Simon de Montfort, even though their power was now greatly reduced. Llywelyn sought to marry Eleanor de Montfort, born c. 1258, Simon de Montfort's daughter. They were married by proxy in 1275, but King Edward took exception to the marriage, in part because Eleanor was his first cousin: her mother was Eleanor of England, daughter of King John and princess of the House of Plantagenet. When Eleanor sailed from France to meet Llywelyn, Edward hired men to seize her ship and she was imprisoned at Windsor Castle until Llywelyn made certain concessions.

== Treaty of Aberconwy ==
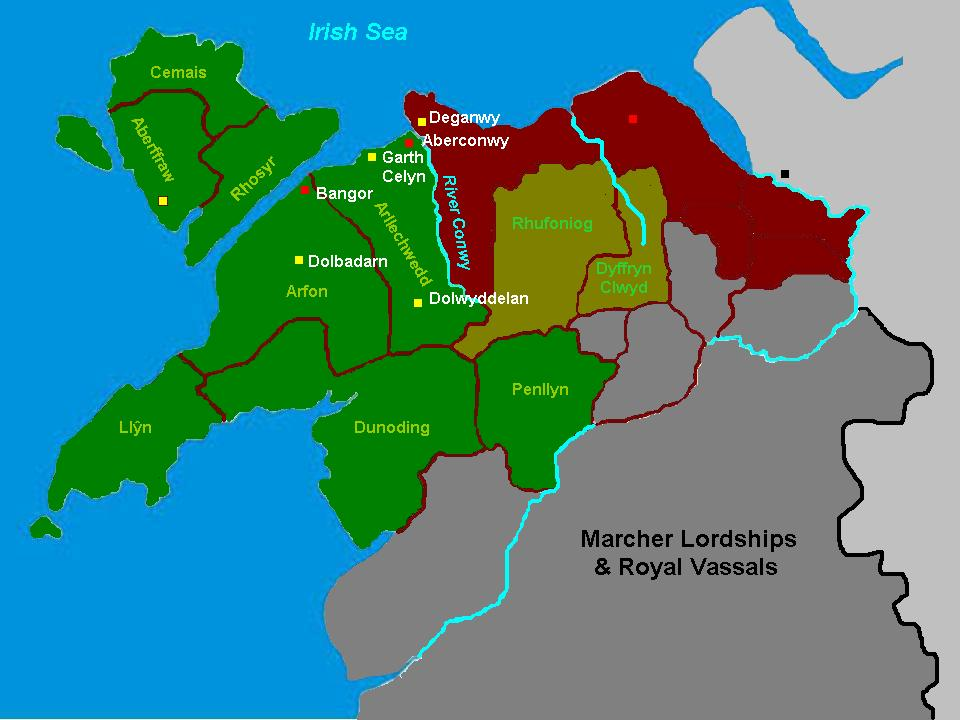
Gwynedd c. 1277. (Note: The division of Gwynedd following the Treaty of Aberconwy in 1277. Llywelyn continued to rule west of the River Conwy (indicated in green). The Perfeddwlad, east of the Conwy, was divided between Dafydd ap Gruffydd (shown in gold) and areas ceded forever to the English Crown (shown in red).)

In 1276 Edward declared Llywelyn a rebel, and in 1277 he gathered an enormous army to march against him. Edward's intention was to disinherit Llywelyn completely and take over Gwynedd Is Conwy himself. He was considering two options for Gwynedd Uwch Conwy: either to divide it between Llywelyn's brothers, Dafydd and Owain, or to annex Anglesey and divide only the mainland between the two brothers. Edward was supported by Dafydd ap Gruffudd and Gruffudd ap Gwenwynwyn. Many of the lesser Welsh princes who had supported Llywelyn had hastened to make peace with Edward. By the summer of 1277, Edward's forces had left from Chester to reach the River Conwy and encamped at Deganwy, while another force had captured Anglesey and took possession of the harvest there. This deprived Llywelyn and his men of food, forcing them to seek terms. The attack came from all directions from east of the border, Henry de Lacy attacked from Shrewsbury and Montgomeryshire, Roger Mortimer to Builth and Gwenwynwyn returned to take back Cyfeiliog and other parts of Powys. The lack of provisions forced Llywelyn into hiding, but the Welsh did see minor successes against the English.

Following the battles, the result was the Treaty of Aberconwy, signed by Llywelyn on 9 November 1277. The outcome and peace accord guaranteed the return of lands to Llywelyn, but at a price. He regained Anglesey and parts of Snowdonia as his Kingdom of Gwynedd ruled as the Prince of Wales with the homage of five lords. He would have to pay a fine of 50,000 marks for the incident and would forgo his share of the rent of Anglesey to the crown. Meanwhile, the Llŷn Peninsula was given to his brother Owain who was released from jail in 1254. Then the Perfeddwlad in Gwynedd was given to Dafydd ap Gruffudd, with a promise that if Llywelyn died without an heir he would be given a share of Gwynedd Uwch Conwy instead.

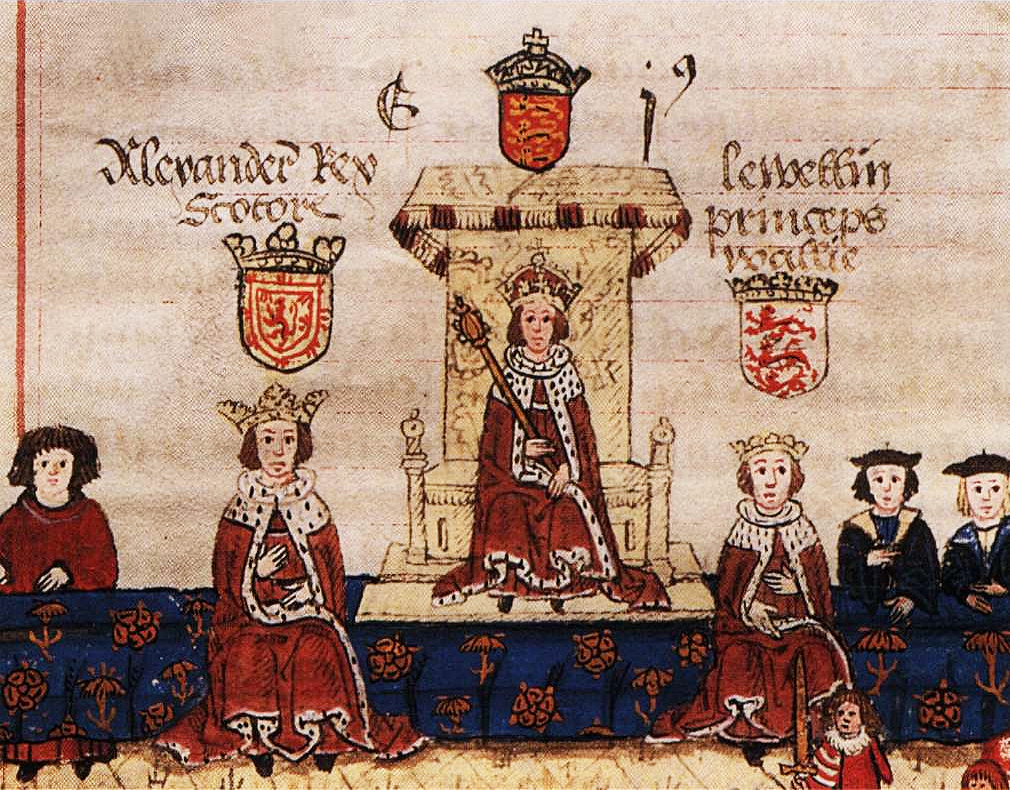
English parliament; left to right: Alexander III of Scotland, Edward I of England, Llywelyn II Prince of Wales.

With the peace accord in place, Llywelyn went to London and Parliament for the Christmas of 1277 and paid homage to the King of England. Llywelyn met Edward, and his partner Eleanor with the royal family at Worcester, they would marry the next year.

Llywelyn exacted peace for several years, however, the English continued to pursue an Anglicisation policy in Wales. In the North East of Wales, the four cantrefs of the Court of Chester were brought under power violently. Whilst in the South West in Cardiganshire (Ceredigion) and Carmarthenshire the same policy was enacted by local sheriffs. The rough policy forced the Archbishop of Canterbury, John Peckham to attempt to bring harmony between the Church of England and the Church in Wales. In 1280, Peckham met with Llywelyn to make an agreement on the changes. However, Llywelyn's intentions were distracted and claimed the truce was broken by his fellow kin, Gruffudd ap Gwenwynwyn. The archbishop reminded Llywelyn that his grievance would not be heard, as Llywelyn's terms of Cyfraith Hywel (Welsh law code) were unreasonable in a contemporary setting. However, Llywelyn reconciled with his brother, Dafydd III, and they listened to the grievances of the cantrefs in Chester and once more secretly plotted a revolt together, this time, the forces of Wales were united against the English.

== Marriage and family ==
Llywelyn agreed with Edward I and was given permission to be married at the door of Worcester Cathedral on 13 October 1278. It was a minor ceremony attended by the Kings of Scotland and England, the Earl of Lancaster. Eleanor was to die in childbirth on 19 June 1282 after she gave birth to a daughter named Gwenllian. Peter Bartrum also identified an illegitimate son named Madog born to Llywelyn. (Note: Since the lifetime of Llywelyn II, sources have differed as to how many children Llywelyn fathered, and whether he has any living descendants. Llywelyn definitely had one daughter named Gwenllian of Wales. However, she died childless in 1337. He was also alleged to have had another daughter by his wife Eleanor de Montfort, named Catherine. However, her existence as Llywelyn's first daughter is contested by Professor John Edward Lloyd, who said when speaking of Gruffydd Fychan II, who supposedly married Catherine's granddaughter, Eleanor (parents of Owain Glyndwr): The genealogists of a later age are not content even with this distinction; they proceed to heighten its effect by alleging that Helen was descended on her mother's side from a daughter of the last Llywelyn, so making Glyn Dwr represent Gwynedd as well as the other two principalities. But there is no evidence that Llywelyn had any daughter but Gwenllian, born in the last year of his life and after his death confined for the rest of her days as a nun of the order of Sempringham. Some authors have subsequently adopted Lloyd's position and deny the existence of Catherine.)

== Last campaign and death ==
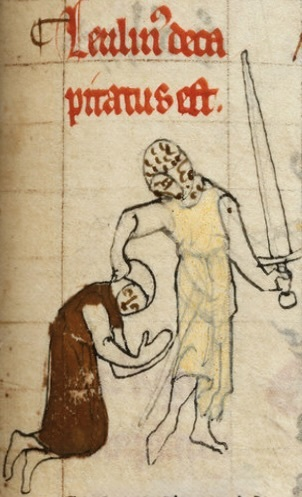
The death of Llywelyn, from the 'Chronicon Roffense'

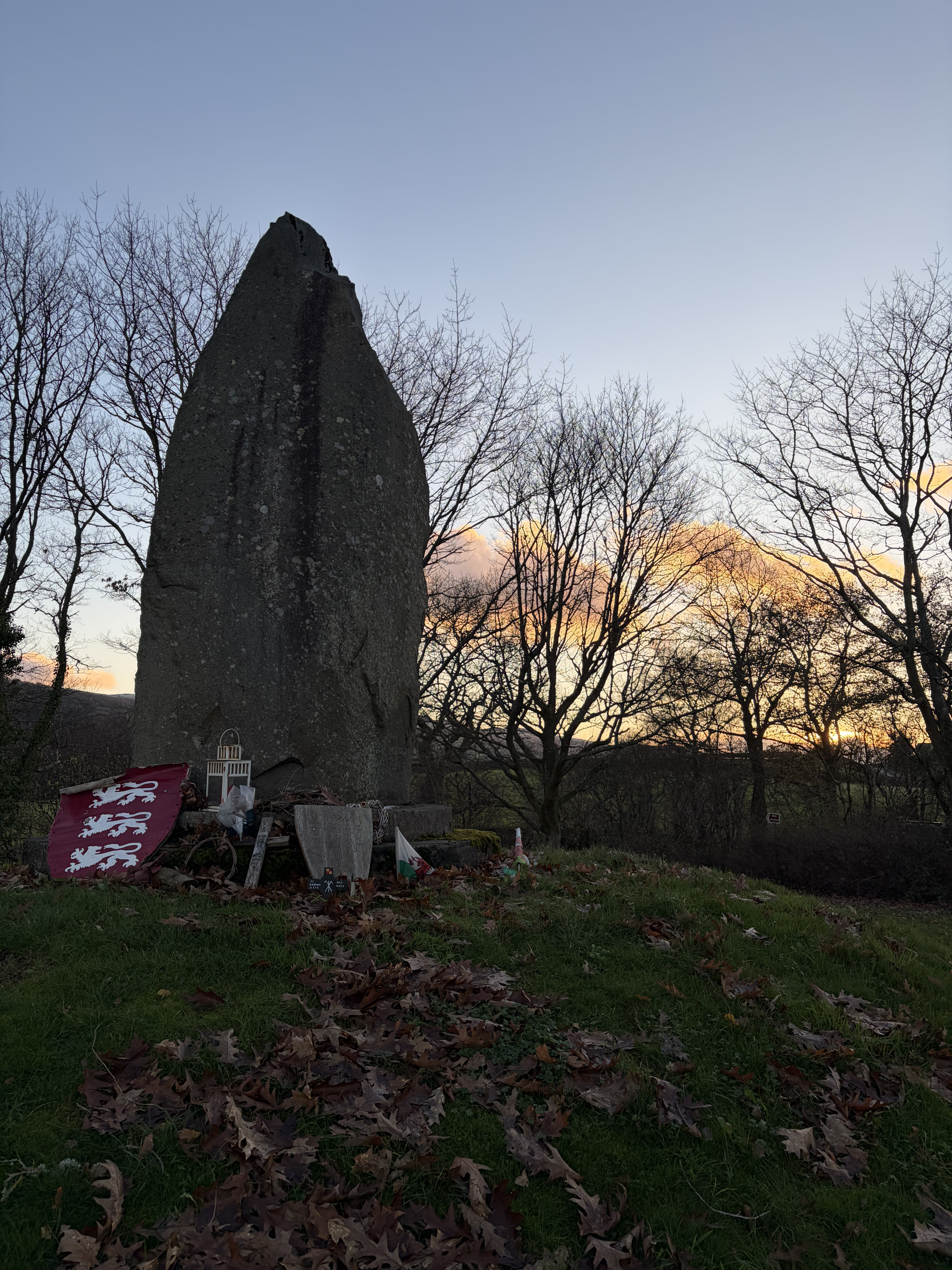
The Llywelyn Monument at Cilmeri near Builth Wells, erected in 1956

By early 1282, many of the lesser princes who had supported Edward against Llywelyn in 1277 were becoming disillusioned with the exactions of the royal officers. On Palm Sunday that year, Dafydd ap Gruffydd attacked the English at Hawarden Castle and then laid siege to Rhuddlan. Meanwhile, the revolt quickly spread to other parts of Wales, with Aberystwyth Castle captured and burnt by Maredudd ap Rhys Gryg (heir of Prince of South Wales/Deheubarth) and rebellion in South Wales, also inspired by Dafydd according to the annals, where Carreg Cennen Castle was captured. Llywelyn, according to a letter he sent to the Archbishop of Canterbury John Peckham, was not involved in the planning of the revolt. He felt obliged, however, to support his brother and a war began for which the Welsh were ill-prepared.

Events followed a similar pattern to 1277, with Edward's forces capturing Gwynedd Is Conwy, Anglesey and taking the harvest. The English force occupying Anglesey tried to cross to the mainland on a bridge of boats but failed and was defeated in the Battle of Moel-y-don. The Archbishop of Canterbury tried mediating between Llywelyn and Edward, and Llywelyn was offered a large estate in England if he would surrender Wales to Edward, while Dafydd was to go on crusade and not return without the king's permission. In an emotional reply, which has been compared to the Declaration of Arbroath, Llywelyn said he would not abandon the people whom his ancestors had protected since "the days of Kamber son of Brutus" and rejected the offer.

Llywelyn now left Dafydd to lead the defence of Gwynedd and took a force South, trying to rally support in Mid and South Wales and open up an important second front. On 11 December at the Battle of Orewin Bridge at Builth Wells, he was killed while separated from his army. The exact circumstances are unclear and there are two conflicting accounts of his death. Both accounts agree that Llywelyn was tricked into leaving the bulk of his army and was then attacked and killed. The first account says that Llywelyn and his chief minister approached the forces of Edmund Mortimer and Hugh Le Strange after crossing a bridge. They then heard the sound of battle as the main body of his army was met in battle by the forces of Roger Despenser and Gruffydd ap Gwenwynwyn. Llywelyn turned to rejoin his forces and was pursued by a lone lancer who struck him down. It was not until some time later that an English knight recognised the body as that of the King. This version of events was written in the north of England some fifty years later and has suspicious similarities with details about the Battle of Stirling Bridge in Scotland.

An alternative version of events written in the east of England by monks in contact with Llywelyn's exiled daughter, Gwenllian ferch Llywelyn, and niece, Gwladys ferch Dafydd, states that Llywelyn, at the front of his army, approached the combined forces of Edmund and Roger Mortimer, Hugo Le Strange, and Gruffydd ap Gwenwynwyn on the promise that he would receive their homage. This was a deception. His army was immediately engaged in fierce battle during which a significant section of it was routed, causing Llywelyn and his eighteen retainers to become separated. At around dusk, Llywelyn and a small group of his retainers (which included clergy) were ambushed and chased into a wood at Aberedw. Llywelyn was surrounded and struck down. As he lay dying, he asked for a priest and gave away his identity. He was then killed and his head hewn from his body. His person was searched and various items recovered, including a list of "conspirators", which may well have been faked, and his privy seal.

If the king wishes to have the copy [of the list] found in the breeches of Llywelyn, he can have it from Edmund Mortimer, who has custody of it and also of Llywelyn’s privy seal and certain other things found in the same place.

— Archbishop Peckham, in his first letter to Robert Bishop of Bath and Wells, 17 December 1282 (Lambeth Palace Archives)

The Archbishop writes further directly to King Edward himself:

To my very dear lord Edward, by the grace of God king of England, lord of Ireland, Duke of Aquitaine, Friar John, by the grace of God, archbishop of Canterbury, primate of all England, sends greeting in great reverence. Lord, know that those who were there at the death of Llywelyn found hidden on his body some small things which we have seen. Among the other things there was a treasonable letter disguised by false names. And that you may be warned, we send a copy of the letter to the bishop of Bath, and the letter itself Edmund Mortimer has, together with Llywelyn’s privy seal, and those things you may have at your pleasure... And Edmund de Mortimer said to me that he had heard from his servants who were there at the death that he asked for a priest before his death, but without sure certainty we would do nothing.

The privy seal of Llywelyn the Last, his wife Eleanor and his brother Dafydd ap Gruffydd are thought to have been melted down by the English after finding them upon their bodies to make a chalice in 1284.

There are legends surrounding the fate of Llywelyn's severed head. It is known that it was sent to Edward at Rhuddlan and after being shown to the English troops based in Anglesey, Edward sent the head on to London. In London, it was set up in the city pillory for a day, and crowned with ivy (i.e. to show he was a "king" of Outlaws and in mockery of the ancient Welsh prophecy, which said that a Welshman would be crowned in London as king of the whole of Britain). Then it was carried by a horseman on the point of his lance to the Tower of London and set up over the gate. It was still on the Tower of London 15 years later.

The last resting place of Llywelyn's body is not known for certain; however, it has always been tradition that it was interred at the Cistercians Abbey at Abbeycwmhir. On 28 December 1282, Archbishop Peckham wrote a letter to the Archdeacon of Brecon at Brecon Priory:

... inquire and clarify if the body of Llywelyn has been buried in the church of Cwmhir, and he was bound to clarify the latter before the feast of Epiphany, because he had another mandate on this matter, and ought to have certified the lord Archbishop before Christmas, and has not done so.

There is further supporting evidence for this hypothesis in the Chronicle of Florence of Worcester:

As for the body of the Prince, his mangled trunk, it was interred in the Abbey of Cwm Hir, belonging to the Cistercian Order.

Another theory is that his body was transferred to Llanrumney Hall in Cardiff.

The poet Gruffudd ab yr Ynad Coch wrote in an elegy on Llywelyn:

Do you not see the path of the wind and the rain?
Do you not see the oak trees in turmoil?
Cold my heart in a fearful breast
For the king, the oaken door of Aberffraw

There is an enigmatic reference in the Welsh annals Brut y Tywysogion, "... and then Llywelyn was betrayed in the belfry at Bangor by his own men". No further explanation is given.

== Annexation ==
With the loss of Llywelyn, Welsh morale and the will to resist diminished. Dafydd was Llywelyn's named successor as Prince of Wales. He carried on the struggle for several months until in June 1283, but was captured in the uplands above Abergwyngregyn at Bera Mountain together with his family. He was brought before Edward, then taken to Shrewsbury where a special session of Parliament condemned him to death. He was dragged through the streets, hanged, drawn and quartered.

After the final defeat of 1283, Gwynedd was stripped of all royal insignia, relics and regalia. Edward took particular delight in appropriating the royal home of the Gwynedd dynasty. In August 1284, he set up his court at Abergwyngregyn, Gwynedd. With equal deliberateness, he removed all the insignia of majesty from Gwynedd; a coronet was solemnly presented to the shrine of St. Edward at Westminster; the matrices of the seals of Llywelyn, of his wife, and of his brother Dafydd were melted down to make a chalice which was given by the king to Vale Royal Abbey where it remained until the dissolution of that institution in 1538, after which it came into the possession of the family of the final abbot. The most precious religious relic in Gwynedd, the fragment of the True Cross known as Cross of Neith, was paraded through London in May 1285 in a solemn procession on foot led by the king, the queen, the archbishop of Canterbury and fourteen bishops and the magnates of the realm. Edward was thereby appropriating the historical and religious regalia of the house of Gwynedd and placarding to the world the extinction of its dynasty and the annexation of the principality to his Crown. Commenting on this a contemporary chronicler is said to have declared "and then all Wales was cast to the ground".

Most of Llywelyn's relatives ended their lives in captivity with the notable exceptions of his younger brother Rhodri ap Gruffudd, of who little is known of, but he had claimed a pension and an estate in England, and also a distant cousin, Madog ap Llywelyn led a revolt in 1294 and briefly claimed the title Prince of Wales. Llywelyn and Eleanor's baby daughter Gwenllian of Wales was captured by Edward's troops in 1283 and was admitted to Sempringham Priory in 1284 in England for the rest of her life, becoming a nun but dying without issue in 1337, probably knowing little of her heritage and speaking none of her language.

Dafydd's two surviving sons were captured and incarcerated at Bristol Gaol, where they eventually died many years later. Llywelyn's elder brother Owain Goch ap Gruffudd was arrested and imprisoned by Llywelyn II. Llywelyn's surviving brother Rhodri ap Gruffudd (who had been exiled from Wales since 1272) survived and held manors in Gloucestershire, Cheshire, Surrey, and Powys and died around 1315. A cousin, Owain Lawgoch, later claimed the title Prince of Wales.

== Ancestry ==
Ancestors of Llywelyn ap Gruffudd

Owain Gwynedd
Iorwerth Drwyndwn
Gwladus ferch Llywarch
Llywelyn ab Iorwerth
Madog ap Maredudd
Margred ferch Madog
Gruffudd ap Llywelyn (ill.)
Iorwerth ap Cynon
Llywarch Goch ab Iorwerth
(NN.) ferch Cadwallon ap Cadrod
Tangwystl Goch ferch Llywarch Goch
Llywarch ap Brân
Tangwystl ferch Llywarch
Rhael ferch Gronwy
Llywelyn ap Gruffudd
Rhodri ab Owain Gwynedd
Thomas ap Rhodri
Caradog ap Thomas
Senana ferch Caradog (Note: Senana is not recorded in early Welsh genealogies.)
Gruffudd ap Beli
Gwyn ap Gruffudd
Efa ferch Gwyn ap Gruffudd

== Arms ==
Coat of arms of Llywelyn ap Gruffudd
Notes Recorded in the time of Edward I. Note a variant with lions rampant. Escutcheon Quarterly Or and Gules, four lions passant counter-changed.

== See also ==
- Castell Du
- List of rulers of Wales

== Sources ==
- Bartrum, P. C., ed. (1976). Welsh Genealogies: AD 300-1400. Cardiff: University of Wales Press. doi:10.20391/40837b6f-1887-4afd-9c6e-9b7e3a122693. ISBN 070830561X. Archived from the original on 6 June 2023.
- Lloyd, John Edward. A History of Wales, from the Earliest Times to the Edwardian Conquest. Vol. II (Reprint Vol. 2 of 2 ed.). Longmans, Green & Co. ISBN 978-1-334-06136-3.
- Maund, Kari L. (2006). The Welsh Kings: Warriors, Warlords and Princes (3rd ed.). Tempus Publishing. ISBN 978-0-7524-2973-1.
- Pierce, T. Jones. Cymdeithas Hanes Sir Caernarfon-Trafodion [Caernarfonshire History society talks]. Abergwyngregyn.
- Siddons, Michael Powell (1991). The Development of Welsh Heraldry. Vol. 1. Aberystwyth: National Library of Wales. ISBN 090715851X.
- —— (1993). The Development of Welsh Heraldry. Vol. 2. Aberystwyth: National Library of Wales. ISBN 090715851X.
- Smith, J. Beverley (2004). "Llywelyn ap Gruffudd (d. 1282), prince of Wales". Oxford Dictionary of National Biography (online ed.). Oxford: Oxford University Press. doi:10.1093/ref:odnb/16875. (Subscription, Wikipedia Library access or UK public library membership required.)
  Smith, J. Beverley (2014) [1998]. Llywelyn ap Gruffudd, Prince of Wales (New ed.). Cardiff: University of Wales Press. ISBN 9781783160075.
- Turvey, Roger (2010). Twenty-One Welsh Princes. Conwy: Gwasg Carreg Gwalch. ISBN 978-1845272692.
- Stephenson, David (1984). The Governance of Gwynedd. University of Wales Press. ISBN 978-0-7083-0850-9. OL 22379507M.
- Y Traethodydd [The Essayist]. July 1998. ISSN 0969-8930. "Garth Celyn evidence (Tystiolaeth Garth Celyn)"

Llywelyn ap Gruffudd Second Dynasty of Gwynedd Died: 11 December 1282
Regnal titles
Preceded by Dafydd ap Llywelyn (1246)	Prince of Gwynedd; 1255–1282	Succeeded by Dafydd ap Gruffudd
Preceded by Dafydd ap Llywelyn (1246)	Prince of Wales; 1258 – 1282	Succeeded by Dafydd ap Gruffudd
