= Mortagne-sur-Gironde =

- Commune
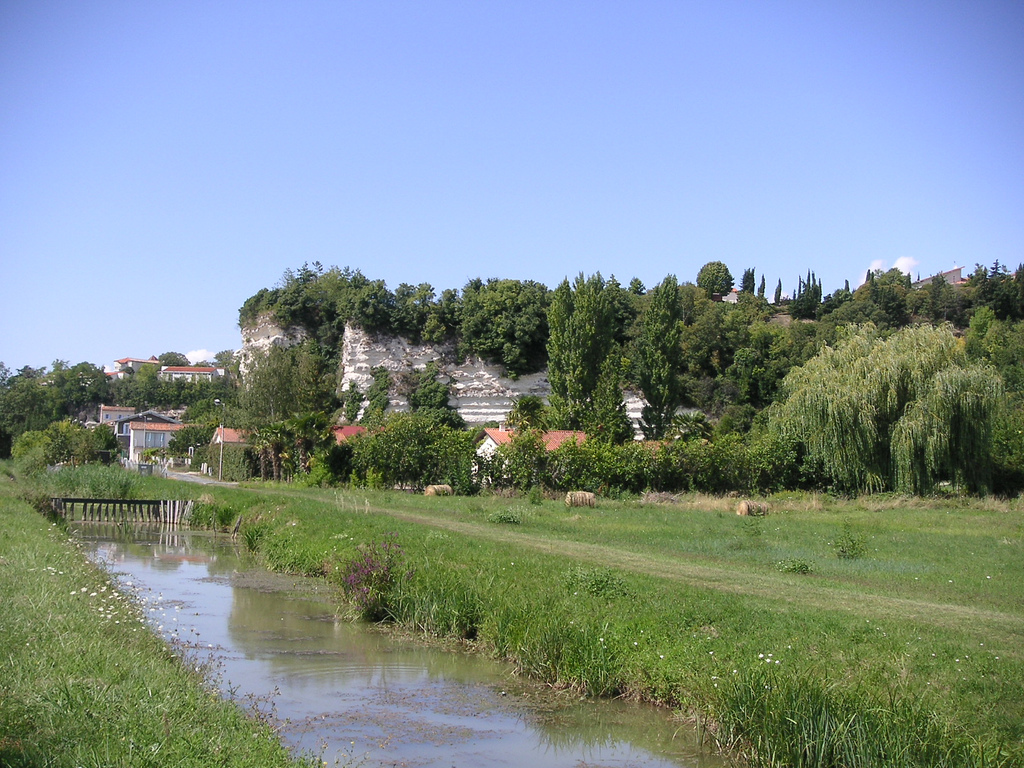
- The falaises mortes, close to the port

- Coat of arms
- Location of Mortagne-sur-Gironde
- Location within France Location within Nouvelle-Aquitaine
- Coordinates: 45°28′56″N 0°47′16″W
- Country: France
- Region: Nouvelle-Aquitaine
- Department: Charente-Maritime
- Arrondissement: Saintes
- Canton: Saintonge Estuaire
- Intercommunality: CA Royan Atlantique

Government
  - Mayor (2020–2026): Stéphane Cotier
- Area^{1}: 18.87 km^{2} (7.29 sq mi)
- Highest elevation: 64 m (210 ft)
- Lowest elevation: 0 m (0 ft)
- Population (2023): 911
  - Density: 48.3/km^{2} (125/sq mi)
- Time zone: UTC+01:00 (CET)
  - Summer (DST): UTC+02:00 (CEST)
- INSEE/Postal code: 17248 /17120
- ^{1} French Land Register data, which excludes lakes, ponds, glaciers > 1 km^{2} (0.386 sq mi or 247 acres) and river estuaries.

Mortagne-sur-Gironde (French pronunciation: [mɔʁtaɲ syʁ ʒiʁɔ̃d]) is a commune in the Charente-Maritime department in southwestern France.

Bordering the banks of the Gironde estuary, this small town was for centuries a principality, a title it acquired after the Hundred Years War, but ended up losing by escheat. Being an important military stronghold, it also became a leading port in the 18th century, with the Gironde port ranked third (after Bordeaux and Blaye) in the middle of the 20th century, before declining gradually. The town now relies mainly on tourism, and remains a relatively active fishing port.

The city is divided into two distinct entities: the old city, camped on a cliff, is organized around its church and some shopping streets, while the port, below, is lined with old mills. Part of the houses have been converted into bars, restaurants and shops, making this part of the city an active economic center in the summer. Not far away stands a monolith hermitage dating back to the early centuries of the Christian era.

Mortagne-sur-Gironde belongs to the Communauté d'agglomération Royan Atlantique, an intercommunal structure involving 83,661 inhabitants (2019).

== Population ==
Its inhabitants are called Mortagnais and Mortagnaises in French.

Historical population
Year	Pop.	±% p.a.
1968	1,210	—
1975	1,121	−1.09%
1982	1,039	−1.08%
1990	972	−0.83%
1999	967	−0.06%
2007	1,037	+0.88%
2012	1,036	−0.02%
2017	904	−2.69%
2023	911	+0.13%
Source: INSEE

== Churches of Mortagne-sur-Gironde ==
=== Church of St. Stephen ===
The origins of St. Stephen's church date back to at least the 12th century, although it hardly remains of elements from that period, except a few walls (parts of the apse and transept) and a series of capitals at the braces (listed historical monument).

In the Middle Ages it was one of two parish churches of the city, with the Church of Our Lady, disappeared. Seat of a convent Augustinian priory, it has authority over several neighboring parishes, including Cozes, Saint-Seurin-d'Uzet, or Champagnolles Gémozac. Burned and looted during the Wars of Religion by the troops of Agrippa Aubigné, it was rebuilt once peace returned, but again in very bad condition in the early 18th century.

A great work campaign is conducted from 1769 under the direction of stonemason Martin and Daniel Maurice Blondeau carpenter. In the following century, the bell tower, cracked, requires constant monitoring. After deliberations, it was finally decided to build a new one. Two architects differ as to the party to implement Gustave Alaux, follower of neo-Gothic style, and Antoine Brossard, holding of neoclassicism. The proposed Alaux finally won, and in 1859 the bell tower Bourg stone, crowned with an arrow used to Mariners bitter, was built. It was taken in 1870 by architect Aimé Bonnet.

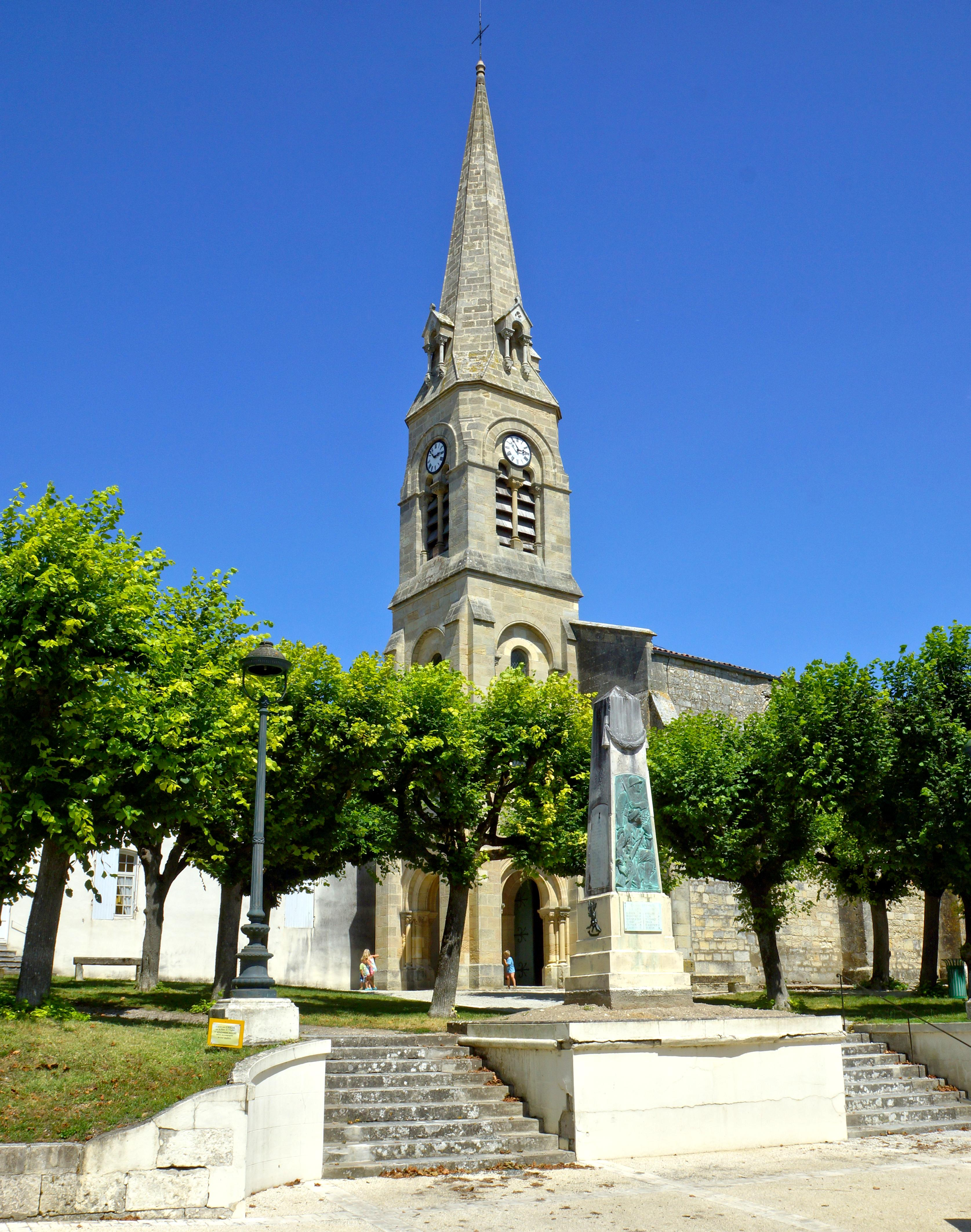
Church Saint-Étienne

=== Church of Saint-Etienne ===
The church of Saint-Etienne, a very sober, is shaped like a Latin cross. It comprises a nave of four bays, lit by a series of arched windows which were placed colorful stained glass from the workshops and DAGRANT dating from 1889. The transept retains a number of medieval capitals, only remnants of the former church. Pilasters serve to support a vault basket handle, which covers almost all of the building. Reinforced concrete, it dates from the late nineteenth century and replaces an old lambris. Numerous indications seem to indicate the presence of a crypt under the north transept; the tradition is that of Charlemagne's companions there were inhumés. Several religious and Mortagnaises different personalities are buried in the church slabs, following an ancient custom.

The church furniture includes an antique altar Louis XVIII, in a taste similar to that of Saujon, a chair Louis XIII, an 18th century the Cross and statues dating mainly from the 19th century.

== Museum ==
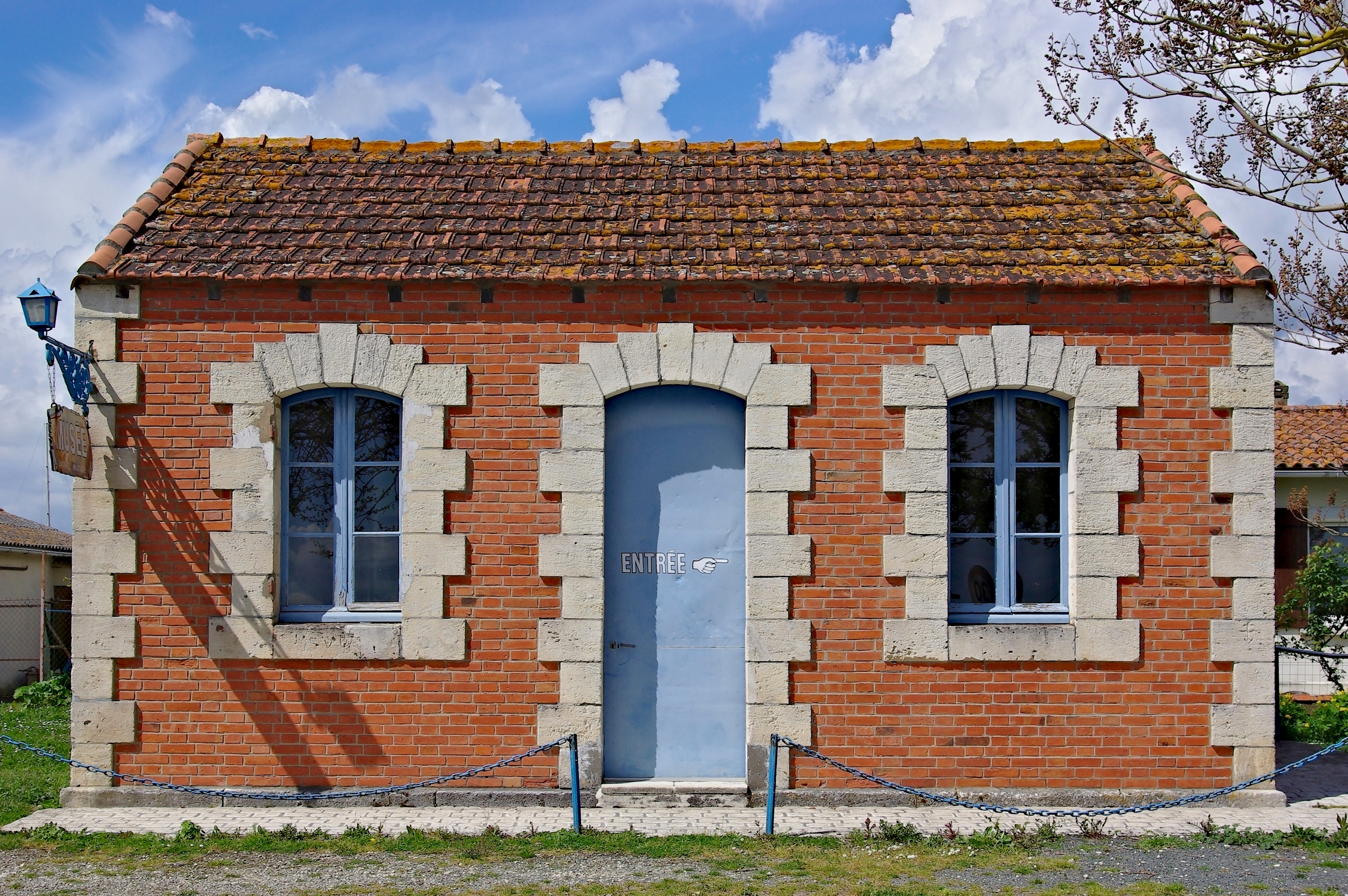
Local museum of postcards

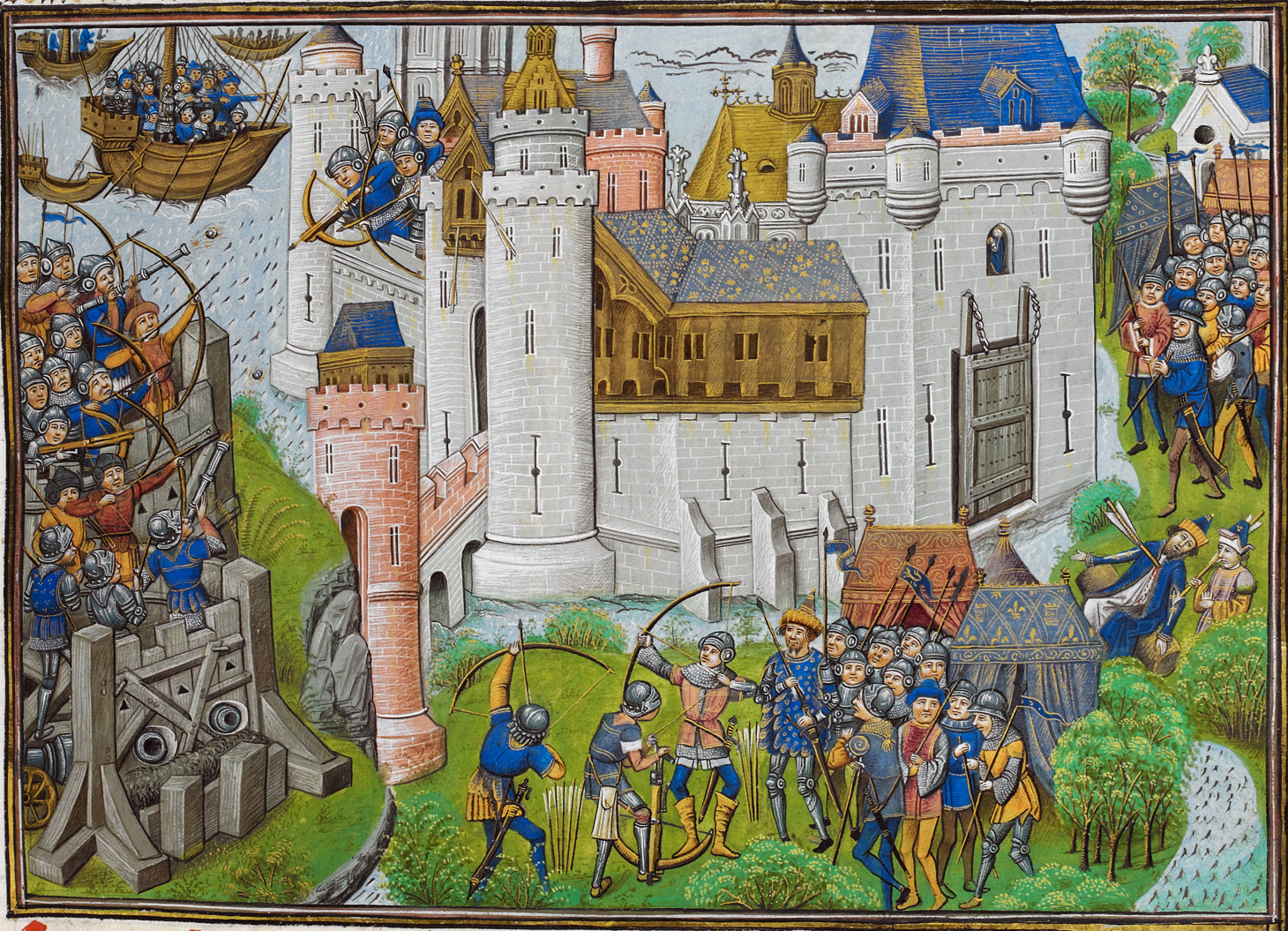
A depiction of Owain's death at Mortagne from a medieval manuscript. Owain is pictured as killed by an arrow, rather than by an assassin' knife.

Since summer 2003, Mortagne-sur-Gironde has set up a small local museum located in the old pier of the current marina, which traces the history of the village through an original background 300 reproductions old postcards. Driven by a communal association, The Pier, it aims to introduce visitors to the history and heritage of this small town on the banks of the Gironde. The entrance to the museum is free.

The presence of the permanent museum actively contributes to the tourist and cultural promotion of the right bank of the Gironde.

== See also ==
- Communes of the Charente-Maritime department
