= Owain Lawgoch =

Welsh mercenary captain and pretender (died 1378)

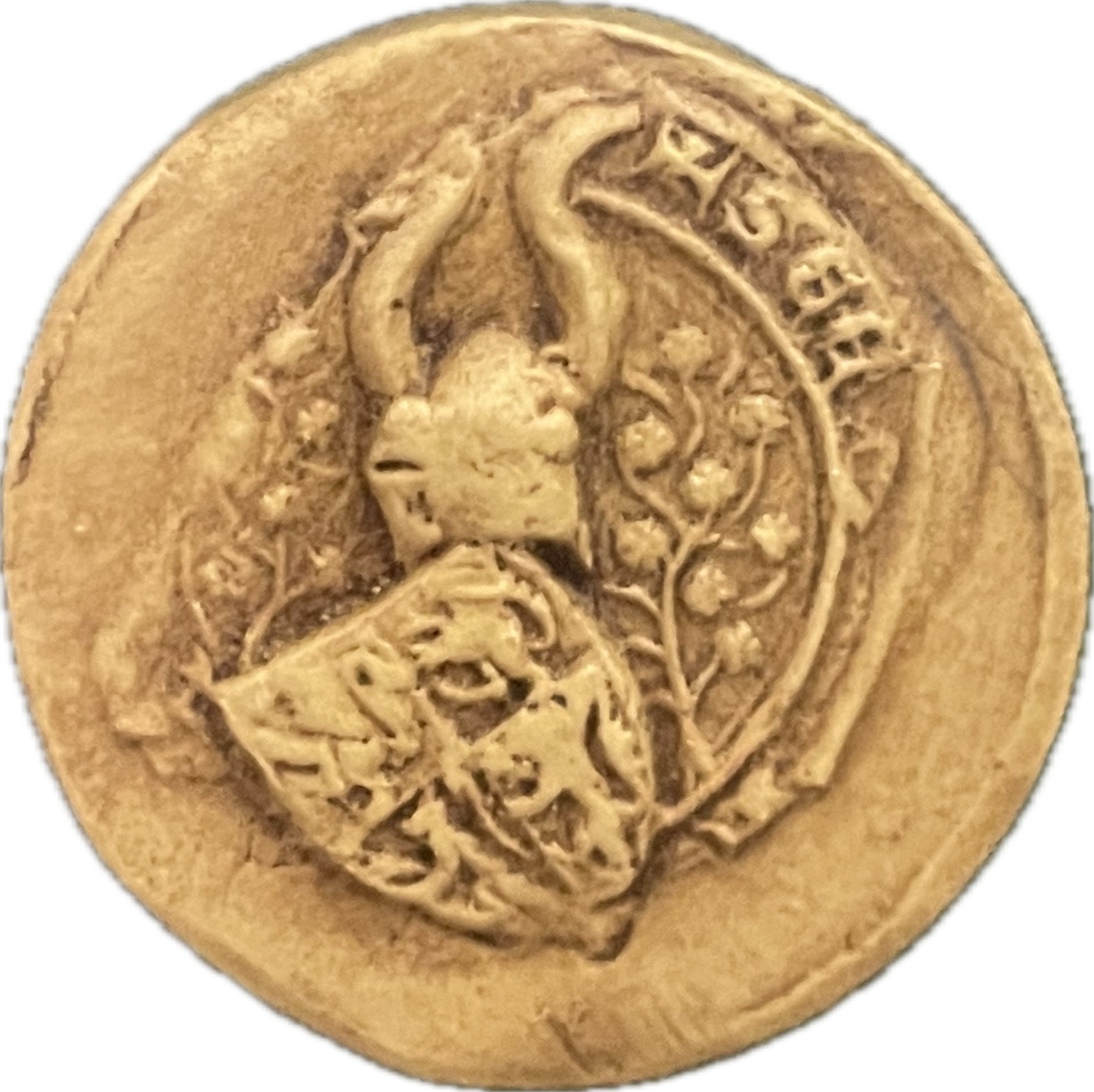
- Seal impression of Owain Lawgoch (Note: Dated to 12 August 1376, the seal bears an image of a crowned helmet with an field on both sides with a flowering branch on each. Its legend is of lombardic letters, reading (based on compiling the reading from other impressions from the same matrix) [LE] SEE[L YVAIN DE GALLES].)

Prince of Wales
- Pretence: 10 May 1372 – July 1378
- Predecessor: Madog ap Llywelyn
- Successor: Owain Glyndŵr
- Died: July 1378; Mortagne, Aquitaine, France
- Cause of death: Assassination
- Burial: Church of Saint Léger, Mortagne
Names
- Welsh: Owain ap Tomas ap Rhodri; Middle English: Owain ap Thomas Retherik; Middle French: Y(e)vain de Galles
- House: Second Dynasty of Gwynedd
- Father: Tomas ap Rhodri
- Mother: Cecilia
- Occupation: Mercenary captain
- Military career
- Conflicts Battles: Hundred Years' War; Castilian Civil War; Gugler War Battle of Poitiers? (1356)

Owain ap Thomas ap Rhodri (Note: Welsh pronunciation: [ˈou̯ai̯n ap ˈtɔmas ap ˈr̥ɔdrɪ]) (died July 1378) or Owain Lawgoch (Note: Welsh pronunciation: [ˈou̯ai̯n ˈlaːu̯ɡoːχ]) ('red-handed Owain') was a Welsh soldier who served in Lombardy, France, Alsace, and Switzerland. He led a Free Company fighting for the French against the English in the Hundred Years' War. As a politically active descendant of Llywelyn the Great in the male line, he was a claimant to the title of Prince of Gwynedd and of Wales.

== Genealogy ==
Owain was a lineal direct descendant of the Welsh Prince Llywelyn the Great, through his illegitimate son Gruffudd (d. 1244). His grandfather was a member of the Welsh Royal House of Gwynedd, and Owain was very aware of his dynastic hereditary claim as the last living male of Llywelyn's family. Following the death of Prince Llywelyn the Last in 1282 and the execution of his brother and successor as the final Prince of Gwynedd Dafydd ap Gruffudd in 1283, the Welsh kingdom paid fealty to and accepted English rule. Llywelyn's daughter Gwenllian ferch Llywelyn was committed to a nunnery at Sempringham, while the sons of Dafydd were kept in Bristol Castle until their deaths. Another of Llywelyn's brothers, Rhodri ap Gruffydd, renounced his rights in Gwynedd and spent much of his life in England as a royal pensioner. His son Thomas inherited lands in England in Surrey, Cheshire and Gloucestershire.

Rhodri was content to end his life as a country gentleman in England, and though his son Thomas ap Rhodri used the four lions of Gwynedd on his seal he made no attempt to win his inheritance. Owain, his only son, was born in Surrey, where his grandfather had acquired the manor of Tatsfield. (Note: Tatsfield, a small village only 17 miles from the centre of London, still has Welsh place names e.g. Maesmawr Road (English: Great Field Road)) Owain entered the military service of Philip IV of France and lived the majority of his life in mainland Europe. Thomas died in 1363 and Owain returned from abroad to Montgomeryshire and proclaimed his patrimony as the Prince of Wales. He was also in Britain during 1365. Owain left again for France in March 1366 and was in French service by 1369 (hostilities in the war were suspended between 1360 and 1369), but for adhering to the enemy he had his lands in Wales and England confiscated.

== Military career ==
The year in which Owain entered the service of the king of France is uncertain. Froissart claims that he fought on the French side at the Battle of Poitiers, but there is no other evidence to support this. He was however deprived of his English lands in 1369, suggesting he was in the service of the French as leader of a free company when the period of truce between France and England following the Treaty of Brétigny ended and hostilities resumed in 1369. His French name was Yvain de Galles ('Owain of Wales').

Owain was the captain of a company consisting largely of Welshmen, many of whom remained in French service for many years. The second in command of this company was Ieuan Wyn, known to the French as le Poursuivant d'Amour, a descendant of Ednyfed Fychan, Seneschal of Gwynedd under Owain's ancestors. Owain also received financial support while in France from Ieuan Wyn's father, Rhys ap Robert. While in French service Owain had good relations with Bertrand du Guesclin and others, and gained the support of Charles V of France.

Welsh soldiery and longbowmen who had fought for Edward I in his campaigns in North Wales remained armed and sold their services to the English kings in their battles in Scotland and at Crecy and Poitiers. Ironically, the Norman attempt to conquer Wales set in train events that reignited Welsh identity and raised up new Welsh military leaders such as Owain, claiming descent from the ancient Princes of Wales.

Evain de Gales, to all those to whom these letters shall come, Greeting. The kings of England in past times having treacherously and covetously, tortuously and without cause and by deliberate treasons, slain or caused to be slain my ancestors, kings of Wales, and others of them have put out of their country, and that country have by force and power appropriated and have submitted its people to divers services, the which country is and should be mine by right of succession, by kindred, by heritage, and by right of descent from my ancestors the kings of that country, and in order to obtain help and succour to recover that country which is my heritage. I have visited... the most puissant and renowned sovereign Charles, by the grace of God king of France, dauphin of Vienne, and have shown unto him my right in the aforesaid country and... [he] has granted me his aid and the assistance of his men-at-arms and fleet in order to recover the said realm, which is my rightful heritage, as has been said... I herewith have made and entered into, for me my heirs and successors and for all my country and subjects for ever, with my said lord the king of France for him and his successors and for all their country and subjects, a good and firm treaty, union and alliance, by which I will aid and assist them by my person, my subjects and my country, to the utmost of my power and loyalty against all persons alive or dead.

— Owain's declaration of 10 May 1372, translation by Owen Edwards.

=== Owain after the treaty of Bruges ===
Owain first attacked the island of Guernsey, and was still there when a message arrived from Charles ordering him to abandon the expedition in order to go to Castile to seek ships to attack La Rochelle. Owain defeated an English and Gascon force at Soubise later that year, capturing Sir Thomas Percy and Jean de Grailly, the Captal de Buch. Another invasion of Wales was planned in 1373 but had to be abandoned. In 1374 he fought at Mirambeau and at Saintonge. In 1375 Owain was employed by Enguerrand de Coucy to help win Enguerrand's share of the Habsburg lands due to him as nephew of the former Duke of Austria. However, during the Gugler War they were defeated by the forces of Bern and had to abandon the expedition.

== Assassination ==
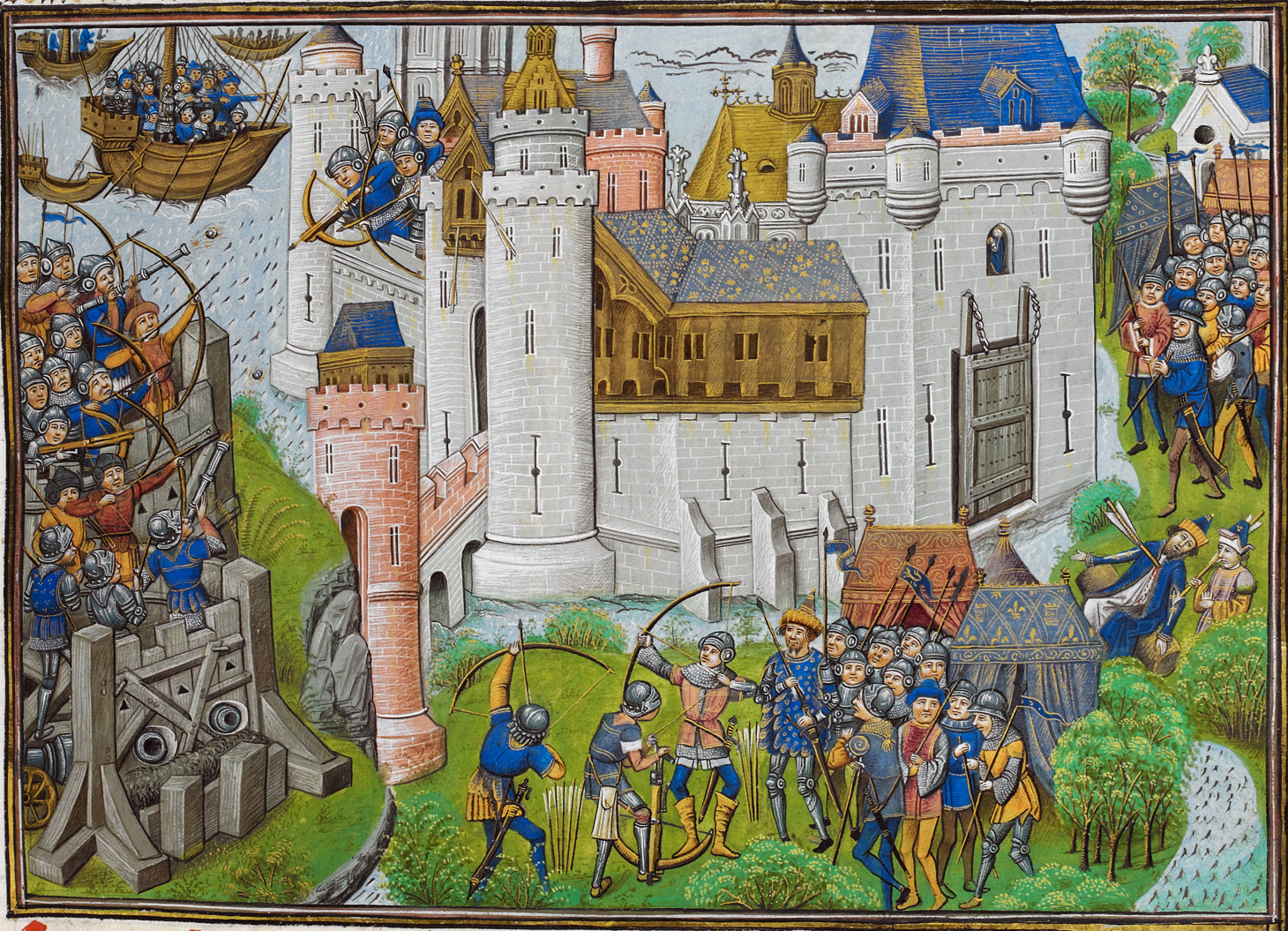
A depiction of Owain's death at Mortagne from a medieval manuscript. Owain is pictured as killed by an arrow, rather than by an assassin's knife

In May 1372 in Paris, Owain announced that he intended to claim the throne of Wales. He set sail from Harfleur with money borrowed from Charles V.

In 1377 there were reports that Owain was planning another expedition, this time with help from Castile. The alarmed English government sent an agent, the Scot John Lamb, to assassinate Owain, who had been given the task of besieging Mortagne-sur-Gironde in Poitou. Lamb gained Owain's confidence and became his squire, which allowed him to stab Owain to death in July 1378, something Walker described as 'a sad end to a flamboyant career'. The Issue Roll of the Exchequer dated 4 December 1378 records "To John Lamb, an esquire from Scotland, because he lately killed Owynn de Gales, a rebel and enemy of the King in France, on his passage to England to explain certain affairs to the Lord the King and his Council. In money paid to his own hands, in discharge of 20l., which the Lord the King commanded to be paid him. By writ of privy seal, &c., — 20l." Owain was buried at the church of St Leger, near Cognac, France.

With the assassination of Owain Lawgoch the senior line of the House of Aberffraw became extinct. The title "Prince of Wales" was later claimed by Owain Glyndŵr by "right of inheritance".

== Owain in legend ==
- The 20th-century reprint of Le Morte d'Arthur introduced by John Rhys tells of Owain Lawgoch (Owen of Cardiganshire), a man of untold riches and 7 feet tall with a red right hand, living in a cave in south Cardiganshire:

This Owen is Henry the Ninth, Who lives in the land of strangers.

- The name Owain in Welsh folklore is a fabled name of the "son of destiny", to which Owain aspired. The prophecy was repeated by Owain Glyndŵr two decades after Owain Lawgoch's death. The next time, Owain's fame and reputation have endured to date.
- Several legends grew around Owain, of which one version from Cardiganshire runs as follows. Dafydd Meurig of Betws Bledrws was helping to drive cattle from Cardiganshire to London. On the way, he cut himself a hazel stick and was still carrying it when he encountered a stranger on London Bridge. The stranger asked Dafydd where he had cut the stick, and ended up accompanying him back to Wales to the place where the stick had been cut. The stranger told Dafydd to dig under the bush, and this revealed steps leading down to a large cave illuminated by lamps, where a man seven feet tall (213 cm) with a red right hand was sleeping. The stranger told Dafydd that this was Owain Lawgoch "who sleeps until the appointed time; when he wakes he will be king of the Britons".
- The quarry reservoir at Aberllefenni in Gwynedd was once known as Llyn Owain Lawgoch, and there is a story linking him with the nearby mansion, Plas Aberllefenni, recorded in "Trem Yn Ol" by J. Arthur Williams.
- In Guernsey, Owain is remembered as Yvon de Galles. He and his Aragonese mercenaries have been absorbed into the island's folklore as an invasion of diminutive but handsome fairies from across the sea. The story goes that the shipwrecked king of the fairies was found unconscious on a Guernsey shore by a girl named Lizabeau. When he awoke, he fell in love with her and carried her across the sea to be his queen. However, the other fairies soon decided that they wanted Guernsey brides, and they invaded the island. The men of the island fought bravely but were slaughtered wholesale, except for two men who hid in an oven. The fairies then took Guernsey wives, which is said to be the reason for the typical Guernseyman's dark hair and short stature.
- A memorial to Owain Lawgoch at his death location was unveiled Mortagne-sur-Gironde in 2003.

== Arms ==
Coat of arms of Owain Lawgoch
Notes The arms of Owain Lawgoch on his seals bear lions rampant, but his arms on his banners, held in the parish church of Berne until their destruction in the eighteenth century by French troops, bore lions passant, and were of the colours of the arms of the earlier princes of Gwynedd. Crest Two curved horns arising from the helmet. Escutcheon Quarterly, in each quarter a lion rampant. Supporters Two lions rampant gardant.

== Ancestry ==
Ancestors of Owain Lawgoch

16. Llywelyn ab Iorwerth
8. Gruffudd ap Llywelyn
17. Tangwystl ferch Llywarch Goch
4. Rhodri ap Gruffudd
18. Caradog ap Tomas
9. Senana ferch Caradog
19. Marged ferch Einion ap Seisyll
2. Tomas ap Rhodri
5. Catherine
1. Owain Lawgoch
3. Cecilia

== Bibliography ==
- Bartrum, P. C., ed. (1976). Welsh Genealogies: AD 300-1400. Cardiff: University of Wales Press. doi:10.20391/40837b6f-1887-4afd-9c6e-9b7e3a122693. ISBN 070830561X. Archived from the original on 6 June 2023.
- Carr, A. D. (1991). Owen of Wales: The End of the House of Gwynedd. University of Wales Press. ISBN 0-7083-1064-8.
- —— (1995). Medieval Wales. Basingstoke: Macmillan. ISBN 0312125097.
- —— (2004). "Owen of Wales [Owain ap Thomas ap Rhodri]". Oxford Dictionary of National Biography (online ed.). Oxford: Oxford University Press. doi:10.1093/ref:odnb/20983. (Subscription, Wikipedia Library access or UK public library membership required.)
- "French memorial to Welsh Prince". BBC News. BBC. 15 August 2003.
- Davies, Rees R. (2000). The Age of Conquest: Wales 1063–1415 (2 ed.). Oxford: Oxford University Press. ISBN 0198208782.
- Davies, Rees. R (1997). The Revolt of Owain Glyndwr. Oxford: Oxford University Press. ISBN 978-0198205081.
- de Garis, Marie (1986). Folklore of Guernsey. ASIN B0000EE6P8.
- Devon, Frederick, ed. (1837). Issues of the exchequer; being a collection of payments made out of His Majesty's revenue, from King Henry III to King Henry VI inclusive. London: John Murray. p. 209.
- Edwards, Owen (1900). "Owain Lawgoch - Yeuain de Galles: Some Facts and Suggestions". Transactions of the Honourable Society of Cymmrodorion: 6–105.
- Fisher, Deborah (2010). "Welsh Pretenders: Owain Lawgoch and Owain Glyndwr". Royal Wales. University of Wales Press. ISBN 978-0-7083-2214-7.
- Jones, John Graham (17 October 2014). The History of Wales. University of Wales Press. ISBN 978-1783161690.
- Malory, Thomas (1906) [1485]. Ernest Rhys (ed.). Le Morte d'Arthur/Introduction . pp. VIII, XV – via Wikisource.
- Owen, Edward (1901). "Owain Lawgoch: a Rejoinder". The Transactions of the Honourable Society of Cymmrodorion. London: 98–113.
- Pierce, Thomas Jones (1959). "OWAIN ap THOMAS ap RHODRI (' Owain Lawgoch '; died 1378), a soldier of fortune and pretender to the principality of Wales". Dictionary of Welsh Biography. National Library of Wales.
- Siddons, Michael (1982). "Welsh Seals in Paris". Bulletin of the Board of Celtic Studies. 29. University of Wales Press: 531–44.
- —— (1985). "Welsh Seals in Paris - Additions and Corrections". Bulletin of the Board of Celtic Studies. 32. University of Wales Press: 233–241.
- —— (1991). The Development of Welsh Heraldry. Vol. 1. Aberystwyth: National Library of Wales. ISBN 090715851X.
- —— (1993). The Development of Welsh Heraldry. Vol. 2. Aberystwyth: National Library of Wales. ISBN 090715851X.
- Turvey, Roger, ed. (2010). Twenty-One Welsh Princes. Gwasg Carreg Gwalch. ISBN 9781845272692.
- Walker, David (1990). Medieval Wales. Cambridge: Cambridge University Press. ISBN 0521311535.

Titles in pretence
Preceded by English title: Edward of Woodstock (1343-76); Welsh pretender: Madog ap Llywelyn (1294-5)	— TITULAR — Prince (King) of Wales; 1372-78	Succeeded by English title: Richard of Bordeaux (1376-77); Welsh pretender: Owain Glyndwr (1400-15)
