= Rhys ap Robert =

Welsh nobleman (died 1377)

Rhys ap Robert (died 1377) was a Welsh nobleman. A descendant of the progenitor of the Tudor dynasty, Ednyfed Fychan (d. 1246), he attained several positions in the administration of north Wales, including co-Constable of Flint Castle in north Wales by 1349, escheator of Caernarfonshire from 1347 to 1350, and rhaglaw (bailiff) of the commote of Dinmael in 1360–61.

Rhys' career was not without controversy. In 1354 he was fined for taking bribes, and in 1358 the men of Englefield in north-east Wales complained to the Black Prince about Rhys' oppressive measures. He lived at Kinmel near Abergele, and was a patron of the poet Iolo Goch.

Rhys' most important role in Welsh society was as a supporter of Owain Lawgoch, a mercenary in French pay and a claimant to the title of Prince of Wales, who attempted to invade Wales with French support in 1369 and again in 1372. During the latter year, Rhys' son Ieuan Wyn - who also served as a mercenary in France - was identified along with Owain as having received over 500 marks from Rhys to aid their fight against the English there. The allegations seem not to have harmed Rhys' career, as he was appointed chief serjeant of the lordship of Denbigh in 1374. He died in 1377.
