= Owain Goch ap Gruffudd =

13th century Welsh royal

Owain Goch ap Gruffudd (also known as Owain Goch [Owain the Red]) (died 1282) was brother to Llywelyn ap Gruffudd and Dafydd ap Gruffudd and, for a brief period in the late 1240s and early 1250s, ruler of part of the Kingdom of Gwynedd (in modern-day North Wales).

== Lineage ==
Owain was the eldest son of Gruffudd ap Llywelyn ap Iorwerth and the grandson of Llywelyn ab Iorwerth (Llywelyn the Great). He was imprisoned together with his father in Criccieth Castle in 1239 by his uncle Dafydd ap Llywelyn and accompanied his father to England two years later when Dafydd was forced to hand Gruffudd over to King Henry III of England. In 1244 Gruffudd was killed when a makeshift rope broke as he attempted to escape from the Tower of London.

This freed Dafydd ap Llywelyn's hand as King Henry could no longer use Gruffudd against him, and war broke out between him and King Henry in the spring of 1244. Owain meanwhile had been freed by Henry after his father's death in the hope that he would start a civil war in Gwynedd, but he remained at Chester, so that when Dafydd died unexpectedly in February 1246 without leaving an heir, his brother Llywelyn, who had supported his uncle against the king, had the advantage of being on the spot.

== Treaty of Woodstock ==
Owain and Llywelyn came to terms with King Henry but were restricted by the terms of the Treaty of Woodstock in 1247 to Gwynedd Uwch Conwy, the part of Gwynedd west of the River Conwy, which was divided between them. Gwynedd Is Conwy, east of the river, was taken over by the king, who gave it to his son, Edward. Though initially paying homage to the English, Owain and Llywelyn soon broke with Henry III in protest over the ruthless raids being conducted on the Welsh borders.

== The Battle of Bryn Derwin ==
The third brother, Dafydd ap Gruffudd, came of age soon afterwards, and King Henry accepted his homage and announced his intention of giving him a part of the already much reduced Gwynedd. Llywelyn refused to accept this, and Owain and Dafydd formed an alliance against him. This led to the Battle of Bryn Derwin in June 1255. Llywelyn defeated Owain and Dafydd and captured them, thereby becoming sole ruler of Gwynedd Uwch Conwy.

The medieval Welsh chronicle Brut y Tywysogion described the struggle thus:

In those days great strife was bred at the instigation of the Devil between the sons of Gruffudd ap Llywelyn, Namely Owain Goch and Dafydd on the one side, and Llywelyn on the other. And then Llywelyn and his men, trusting in God, awaited, unafraid on Bryn Derwin the fierce coming of his brothers, and a mighty host along with them. And before the end of one hour, Owain Goch was captured and Dafydd fled, after many of his host had been slain.

== Imprisonment and release ==
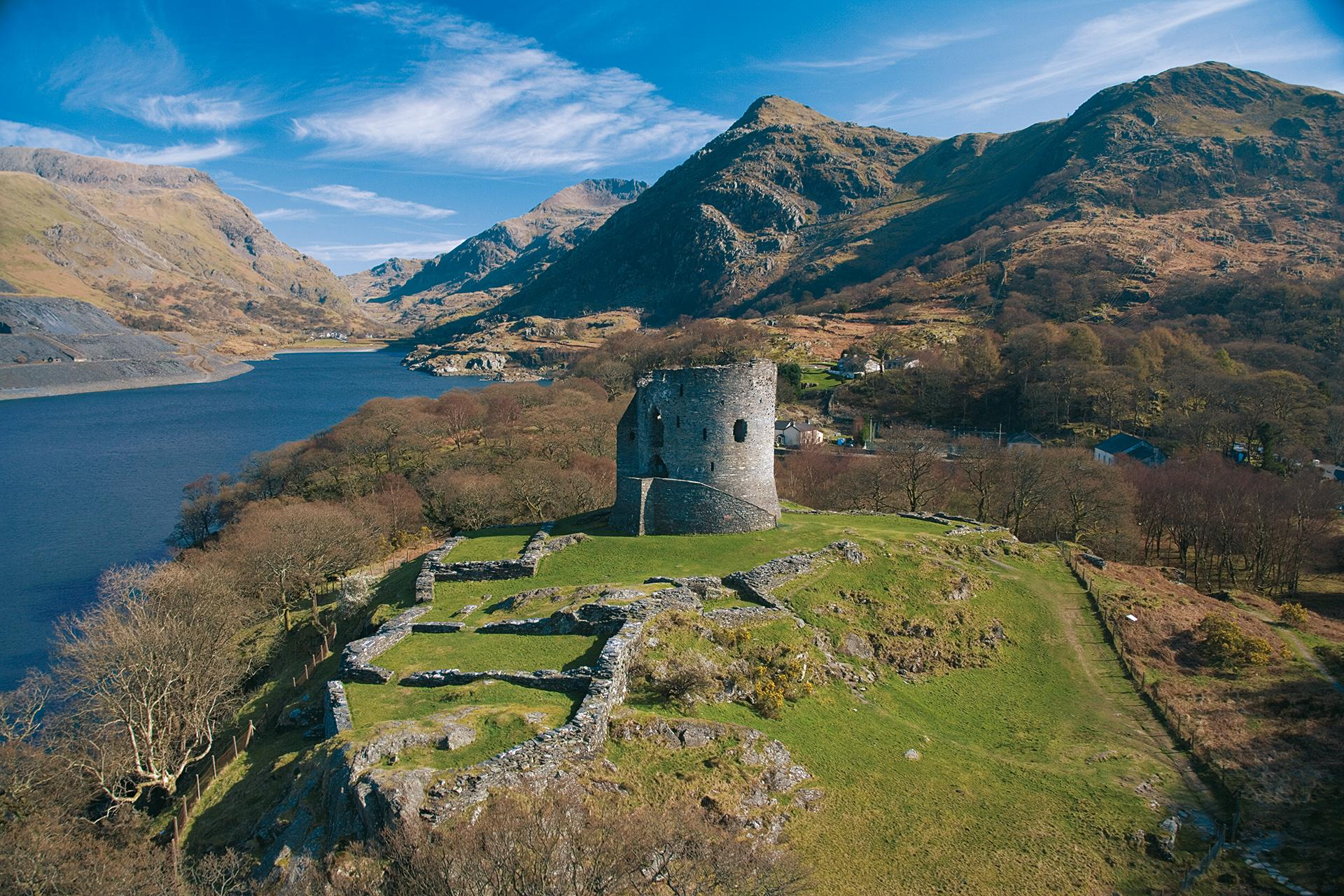
Dolbadarn Castle in Snowdonia, where Owain is thought to have been held captive

With his brothers out of the way, Llywelyn proceeded to extend Gwynedd's territory until it encompassed much of the rest of Wales, in the process claiming the title of Prince of Wales. Owain was imprisoned again and remained in prison until 1277.

In a contemporary poem of the 13th century, court poet Hywel Foel ap Griffri laments Owain's captivity, describing him in the opening line as: Gŵr ysydd yn nhŵr yn hir westai (a man who is in the tower, long a guest).

It is unclear where Owain was imprisoned, but some scholars believe he was kept in Dolbadarn Castle near Llanberis. Wherever he was kept, Llywelyn reluctantly released Owain in 1277 under the terms of the Treaty of Aberconwy, after some 20 years of captivity.

Upon being released, Owain retired to his estate in north-west Wales and never again mounted a serious challenge to his brother Llywelyn's rule. He is thought to have died c. 1282.

== See also ==
- List of rulers of Wales

Preceded by Dafydd ap Llywelyn	King of Gwynedd; 1246–1255; With: Llywelyn ap Gruffudd	Succeeded by Llywelyn ap Gruffudd
