= Gruffudd ap Llywelyn ab Iorwerth =

Welsh prince (c. 1196 – 1244)

Gruffudd ap Llywelyn
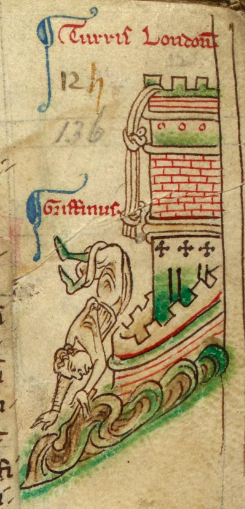
- Matthew Paris's depiction of Gruffudd's fall from the Tower of London

Prince of Gwynedd
- Reign: 11 April 1240 – 1 March 1244
- Contender: Dafydd ap Llywelyn
- Died: 1 March 1244; Tower of London, England
- Cause of death: Falling (accident)
- Burial: Aberconwy Abbey
- Spouse: Senana ferch Caradog
- Issue: Llywelyn ap Gruffudd; Owain Goch ap Gruffudd; Dafydd ap Gruffudd; Rhodri ap Gruffudd
- House: Second Dynasty of Gwynedd
- Father: Llywelyn ab Iorwerth
- Mother: Tangwystl Goch

Gruffudd ap Llywelyn ab Iorwerth (died 1 March 1244) was a Welsh prince, and the first-born son of Llywelyn ab Iorwerth (Llywelyn the Great).

== Hostage ==
As a boy, Gruffudd was one of the hostages taken by King John of England as a pledge for his father's continued good faith. A clause in Magna Carta (1215) compelled his release. On his father's death in 1240, under Welsh law, he would have been entitled to consideration as his father's successor. Llywelyn, however, had excluded him from the succession and had declared Dafydd, his son by his wife Joan, to be heir to the kingdom. Llywelyn went to great lengths to strengthen Dafydd's position, probably aware that there would be considerable Welsh support for Gruffudd against the half-English Dafydd.

== Power ==
Gruffudd was given lands in Ardudwy and Meirionnydd by his father, though in 1221 he was removed for maladministration of those lands. In 1223 he commanded a force of his father's army, against William Marshal. His father then imprisoned him between 1228 and 1234. On his release he was again given lands, this time controlling much of the commotes of Llŷn, Ceri, Cyfeiliog, Mawddwy, Mochnant and Caereinion.

== Imprisonment ==
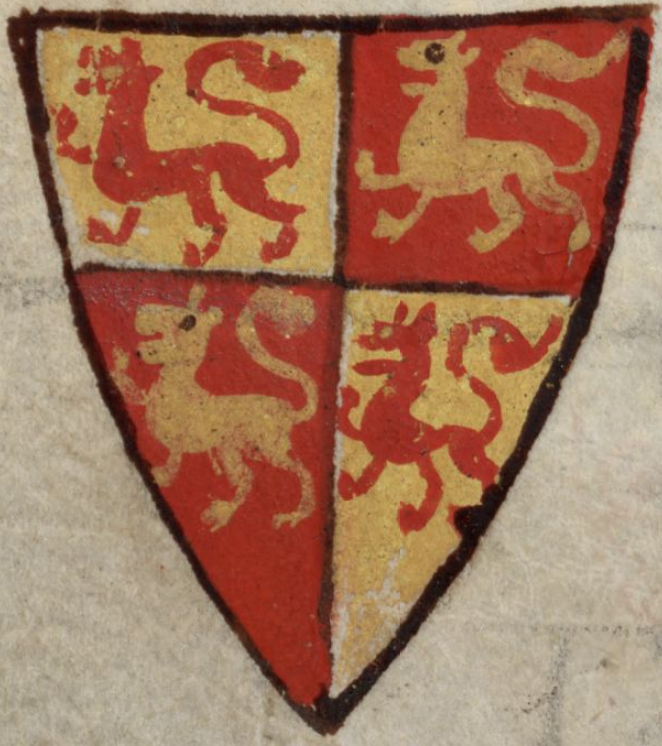
Coat of arms attributed to Gruffudd as it appears in Cambridge, Corpus Christi College, Parker Library MS 16 II (Chronica Majora).

Gruffudd was held prisoner by his brother Dafydd when the latter took over Gwynedd. Following a successful invasion of the Welsh borders by King Henry III of England in 1241, Dafydd was obliged to hand over Gruffudd into the King's custody; he was then taken to London and imprisoned in the Tower of London. Gruffudd's wife, Senana (possibly a daughter of Caradog ap Thomas of Anglesey), agreed to pay Henry 600 marks for the release of her husband and their eldest son, Owain, and to hand over her two youngest sons, Dafydd and Rhodri, to the King as hostages to ensure that she kept her part of the bargain. Henry did not keep his part, however, and kept Gruffudd and his son imprisoned as "guests" because this continued to give him the possibility of using Gruffudd as a weapon against his brother.

== Death ==
However, Gruffudd died while attempting to escape from the Tower in 1244. He is said to have used an improvised rope made from sheets and clothes to lower himself from his window, but as he was a heavy man, the rope broke and he fell to his death.

In 1248, the abbots of Strata Florida and Aberconwy arranged for the return of his body to Wales, where he was buried at Aberconwy with his father.

== Succession ==
After his death Gruffudd's four sons—Owain, Llywelyn, Dafydd and Rhodri—would come into their own, and after much fraternal discord, Llywelyn ended up ruling most of Wales. He also had three daughters, Gwladus, Catrin and Margred.

According to several non-contemporary Welsh genealogical tracts, the mother of Llywelyn was Rhanullt, an otherwise unknown daughter of Rǫgnvaldr Guðrøðarson, King of the Isles. If correct, these sources could indicate that Gruffudd married a daughter of Rǫgnvaldr in about 1220. Contemporary sources, however, show that Llywelyn's mother was Senana, an undoubted wife of Gruffudd.
