= Senana ferch Caradog =

Welsh princess (c. 1198 – 1263)

Senana ferch Caradog (c. 1198 – 1263) was the wife of Gruffudd ap Llywelyn Fawr (1198–1244). Senana's full name was Senana ferch Caradog ap Thomas ap Rhodri ab Owain Gwynedd therefore Owain Gwynedd was her great great grandfather, although she came from an illegitimate line. She had four sons: Owain, Llywelyn, Dafydd and Rhodri. Additionally she had two known daughters: Gwladus and Margaret. Although it is unknown exactly when she died, she was buried in 1263 in Llanfaes.

== Gruffudd ap Llywelyn Fawr's imprisonment ==
In 1239 Gruffudd was imprisoned by his father, Llywelyn, following Llywelyn's sudden stroke. He was imprisoned to ensure the safety of his father's chosen heir Dafydd ap Gruffudd was the first born son but he was considered illegitimate. Following Llywelyn's death in 1240, Senana appealed to Dafydd ap Llywelyn to release her husband but was unsuccessful.

After this, in April 1241, she appealed directly to King Henry III of England. She was able to address the King due to her noble status as well as her marital and genealogical connections. These connections and their support for the release of Senana's husband are shown by the pledges given by noblemen such as: Ralph de Mortimer; Walter de Clifford; Gruffudd ap Madog of Bromfield and his brothers. Initially negotiations between Henry and Senana went well, both parties agreed to the terms and a charter was signed to release Gruffudd and their son Owain Goch ap Gruffydd. In exchange for this pardon Henry III would receive six hundred marks and an additional three hundred mark every year if Gruffudd gained the lands he would have received from Llwelyn's estate when Llwelyn died. However, after this charter was signed, Gruffydd was not released but transferred from Dafydd's prison in Criccieth Castle to Henry III's prison in the Tower of London where he was well treated. It was recorded that Senana was allowed to visit him.
