= Treaty of Aberconwy =

1277 treaty between England and Wales

Gwynedd after the Treaty of Aberconwy 1277 Gwynedd, Llywelyn ap Gruffudd's principality Territories of Dafydd ap Gruffudd Territories ceded forever to the English Crown

The Treaty of Aberconwy was signed on the 10th of November 1277, and was made between King Edward I of England and Llywelyn ap Gruffudd, Prince of Wales. It followed Edward's invasion of Llywelyn's territories earlier that year. The treaty re-established peace between the two but also essentially guaranteed that Welsh self-rule would end upon Llywelyn's death and represented the completion of the first stage of the Conquest of Wales by Edward I.

== Background ==
Llywelyn, wanting to cement his links to royalty more forcefully, sought to marry Eleanor de Montfort, daughter of Simon de Montfort and King Edward's cousin. They were married by proxy in 1275, but when Eleanor sailed from France to meet Llewelyn, Edward hired pirates to seize her ship; she was imprisoned at Windsor Castle.

Edward, who was newly acceded to the throne of England, viewed Llywelyn as a threat, and particularly disliked the idea of his marrying the daughter of de Montfort, who had been the biggest threat to his royal predecessor's reign. Edward also summoned Llewelyn to appear before him on several occasions, which Llywelyn refused on the grounds that he was not safe at Edward's court.

In 1276, Edward declared Llywelyn a rebel and gathered an enormous army to march against him. By the summer of 1277, Edward's forces had reached the heart of Gwynedd. Edward's men confiscated the harvest in Anglesey, which deprived Llewelyn and his men of food, forcing Llywelyn to surrender.

== Treaty ==
The treaty was signed in November 1277. Under its terms, Llywelyn was left only with the western part of Gwynedd, though he was allowed to retain the title of Prince of Wales. Eastern Gwynedd was split between Edward and Llywelyn's brother Dafydd ap Gruffydd, who had defected to Edward. The remainder of the lands that had been tributary to Llywelyn came effectively under Edward's control.

As a result of both territorial expropriation and the submission of the ruling families, Deheubarth, Powys and mid-Wales became a mixture of directly controlled English royal land and pliant English protectorates. Edward's victory was comprehensive and it represented a major redistribution of power and territory in Wales in Edward's favour. Edward now enjoyed a degree of direct control in the native Welsh areas which no previous English king had achieved.

== Consequences ==
In the years after the treaty, Llywelyn sought to consolidate what power he had left. He paid homage and tribute to Edward, who agreed to allow Llewelyn's marriage to go forward. In 1278, Llywelyn and Eleanor de Montfort were married in Worcester Cathedral, with Edward present at the nuptials.

However, Llywelyn's brother Dafydd was discontented with the reward he had received from Edward under the treaty. As a consequence, he rebelled against Edward in 1282. Dafydd's rebellion soon assumed the character of a national struggle against Edward causing Llewelyn and the other Welsh leaders to join in. Edward, in response, began to see it as a war of conquest. Llywelyn was killed at the Battle of Orewin Bridge in December 1282, and Edward's conquest of Wales was completed with Dafydd's capture in June 1283.

== See also ==
- List of treaties
