= Gwynedd Uwch Conwy =

Gwynedd Uwch Conwy (Welsh, meaning Gwynedd Above the Conwy), was the portion of the former Kingdom of Gwynedd lying to the west of the River Conwy in north Wales, including the island of Anglesey. This area was typically the bastion of native Welsh resistance to English subjugation and occupation attempts during the Middle Ages and the location for the principal royal estates and fortresses of the ruling House of Aberffraw.
