= 881 =

Calendar year

881 in various calendars
Gregorian calendar	881; DCCCLXXXI
Ab urbe condita	1634
Armenian calendar	330; ԹՎ ՅԼ
Assyrian calendar	5631
Balinese saka calendar	802–803
Bengali calendar	287–288
Berber calendar	1831
Buddhist calendar	1425
Burmese calendar	243
Byzantine calendar	6389–6390
Chinese calendar	庚子年 (Metal Rat); 3578 or 3371 — to — 辛丑年 (Metal Ox); 3579 or 3372
Coptic calendar	597–598
Discordian calendar	2047
Ethiopian calendar	873–874
Hebrew calendar	4641–4642
- Hindu calendars
Vikram Samvat	937–938
Shaka Samvat	802–803
Kali Yuga	3981–3982
Holocene calendar	10881
Iranian calendar	259–260
Islamic calendar	267–268
Japanese calendar	Gangyō 5 (元慶５年)
Javanese calendar	779–780
Julian calendar	881; DCCCLXXXI
Korean calendar	3214
Minguo calendar	1031 before ROC 民前1031年
Nanakshahi calendar	−587
Seleucid era	1192/1193 AG
Thai solar calendar	1423–1424
Tibetan calendar	ལྕགས་ཕོ་བྱི་བ་ལོ་ (male Iron-Rat); 1007 or 626 or −146 — to — ལྕགས་མོ་གླང་ལོ་ (female Iron-Ox); 1008 or 627 or −145

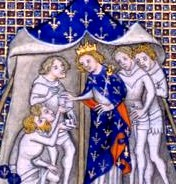
Charles the Fat is crowned Holy Roman Emperor (881)

Year 881 (DCCCLXXXI) was a common year starting on Sunday of the Julian calendar.

== Events ==
=== By place ===
==== Europe ====
- February 12 – King Charles the Fat, the third son of the late Louis the German, is crowned as Holy Roman Emperor by Pope John VIII at Rome.
- August 3 – Battle of Saucourt-en-Vimeu: The West Frankish kings Louis III, and his brother Carloman II, rout Viking raiders (near Abbeville).

==== Britain ====
- Battle of the Conwy: King Anarawd of Gwynedd (Wales) initiates a revenge attack on the Mercian armies, and defeats them on the River Conwy.
- Anarawd, and his brothers Cadell and Merfyn, begin extensive military campaigns to quell resistance in Powys and Seisyllwg (approximate date).

==== Arabian Empire ====
- Zanj Rebellion: Abbasid general Al-Muwaffaq lays siege to the Zanj capital of Mukhtara, using his base on the opposite side of the River Tigris.

==== Asia ====
- Bakong, the first temple mountain of sandstone, is constructed by rulers of the Khmer Empire (modern Cambodia) at Angkor.
- 881 Acre earthquake: It takes place in the vicinity of Acre. Alexandria is reportedly affected by the same earthquake.

=== By topic ===
==== Religion ====
- St. Cecilia's Church (Cäcilienkirche) is founded as a college for women. It is now home of the Schnütgen Museum in Cologne.

== Births ==
- Conrad I, king of the East Frankish Kingdom (approximate date)
- Hugh of Arles, king of Italy and Lower Burgundy (or 880)
- Liu Churang, Chinese general (d. 943)

== Deaths ==
- December 7 – Anspert, archbishop of Milan
- Bárid mac Ímair, king of Dublin
- Cui Hang, chancellor of the Tang Dynasty
- David I, prince of Iberia (Georgia)
- Gabriel, prince of Kakheti (Georgia)
- Guaifer, duke of Benevento
- John I, Frankish abbot (approximate date)
- Liu Ye, chancellor of the Tang Dynasty
- Lu Guimeng, Chinese poet
- Odo I, bishop of Beauvais
- Orso I, doge of Venice
- Radi Abdullah, Muslim tenth Imam
- Zhang Zhifang, Chinese general

== Sources ==
- Antonopoulos, J. (1980), Data from investigation of seismic Sea waves events in the Eastern Mediterranean from 500 to 1000 A.D., Annals of Geophysics
