= 10th century in Wales =

- 9th century | 11th century | Other years in Wales
- Other events of the century

This article is about the particular significance of the century 901–1000 to Wales and its people.

== Events ==
905

- The kingdom of Dyfed passes to Hywel Dda as a result of his marriage to Elen, the daughter of Llywarch ap Hyfaidd, following the death of Llywarch's heir, Rhydderch.

920

- Hywel Dda unites the kingdoms of Dyfed and Seisyllwg to create Deheubarth.

928

- King Æthelstan of England receives the submission of Welsh kings, including Hywel Dda, and sets the border of Wales at the River Wye.

969

- Iago ab Idwal imprisons his brother Ieuaf ap Idwal.

985

- Cadwallon ab Ieuaf becomes King of Gwynedd.

986

- Maredudd ab Owain becomes King of Gwynedd, after disposing of its previous ruler, Cadwallon ab Ieuaf.

987

- Maredudd ab Owain becomes King of Deheubarth.

992

- Maredudd ab Owain attacks Morgannwg.

999

- Cynan ap Hywel becomes King of Gwynedd.
- Vikings sack St David's and murder the bishop, Morgeneu.

== Births ==
- date unknown - Llywelyn ap Seisyll, King of Gwynedd and Deheubarth (d. 1023)

== Deaths ==
900

- Merfyn ap Rhodri, prince of Gwynedd

909

- Cadell ap Rhodri, King of Seisyllwg

916

- Anarawd ap Rhodri, King of Gwynedd

942

- Idwal Foel, King of Gwynedd

950

- Hywel Dda, King of most of Wales

953

- Haearnddur, son of Merfyn ap Rhodri (probable)

979

- Iago ab Idwal, King of Gwynedd

985

- Hywel ab Ieuaf, King of Gwynedd

986

- Cadwallon ab Ieuaf, King of Gwynedd

987

- Owain ap Hywel, King of Deheubarth

999

- Maredudd ab Owain, King of Gwynedd and Deheubarth
- Morgeneu, Bishop of St David's (in Viking raid)
