= Family tree of Welsh monarchs =

This is the family tree of the kings of the respective Welsh medieval kingdoms of Gwynedd, Deheubarth and Powys, and some of their more prominent relatives and heirs as the direct male line descendants of Cunedda Wledig of Gwynedd (401–1283), and Gwrtheyrn of Powys (c. 5th century – 1160), then also the separate Welsh kingdoms and petty kingdoms, and then eventually Powys Fadog until the 15th century and also the family of the Tudors of Penmynydd. However, the early generations of these genealogies are traditional, and their historical accuracy is debated by scholars.

== Family tree ==
Cunedda; Gwynedd	Vortigern; Powys
Ceredig ap Cunedda; Ceredigion	Einion Yrth; Gwynedd	Cadeyern Fendigaid; Powys –455
Usai ap Ceredig; Ceredigion	Cadwallon Lawhir ap Einion; Gwynedd	Owain Danwyn; Rhos	Rhuddfedel Frych	Cadell Ddyrnllwg; Powys; 455–
Serwyl ap Usai; Ceredigion	Maelgwn Gwynedd; Gwynedd –547	Cuneglasus; Rhos	Cyngen Glodrydd; Powys c. 550
Boddw ap Serwyl; Ceredigion	Rhun ap Maelgwn; Gwynedd; 547–	Meig ap Cynlas	Einion ap Cynlas; Rhos	Brochwel Ysgithrog; Powys c. 570	Pasgen ap Cyngen; Powys c. 500 – c. 520
Arthfoddw ap Boddw; Ceredigion	Beli ap Rhun; Gwynedd	Cyngen ap Meig	Cynan Garwyn; Powys c. 560 – c. 600	Morgan ap Pasgen; Powys c. 520 – c. 540
Arthlwys ap Arthwfoddw; Ceredigion	Iago ap Beli; Gwynedd –616	Cadwal Crysban ap Cyngen	Selyf ap Cynan; Powys c. 600–616
Cadfan ap Iago; Gwynedd; 616–c.625	Idgwyn ap Cadwal	Eiludd Powys	Mael Myngan ap Selyf	Cloten ap Nowy; Dyfed; 650–670; Brycheiniog; 655–670
Clydog ap Arthlwys; Ceredigion	Cadwallon ap Cadfan; Gwynedd c.625–634	Einion ap Idgwyn	Beli ap Eiludd	Cadafael Cadomedd ap Cynfeddw; Gwynedd; 634–655	Caten ap Cloten; Dyfed and Brycheiniog; 670–690
Seisyll ap Clydog; Ceredigion	Cadwaladr; Gwynedd; 655–682	Rhufon ap Einion	Gwylog ap Beli	Cadwgan ap Caten; Dyfed and Brycheiniog; 690–710
Arthgen ap Seisyll; Seisyllwg –807	Idwal Iwrch; Gwynedd; 682–720	Meirion ap Rhufon	Elisedd ap Gwylog; Powys	Rhain ap Cadwgan; Dyfed; 710–730; Brycheiniog; 710–720	Awst ap Cadwgan
Dyfnwal ap Arthgen; Seisyllwg 807–	Rhodri Molwynog ap Idwal; Gwynedd; 720–754	Caradog ap Meirion; Gwynedd; 754–798	Brochfael ap Elisedd; Powys; 755–773	Tewdws ap Rhain; Dyfed; 730–760	Elwystl ap Awst; Brycheiniog; 735–750
Meurig ap Dyfnwal; Seisyllwg –849	Cynan Dindaethwy ap Rhodri; Gwynedd; 798–816	Hywel ap Rhodri Molwynog; Gwynedd; 816–825	Cadell ap Brochfael; Powys; 773–808	Maredudd ap Tewdws; Dyfed; 760–796
Ethyllt ferch Cynan	Gwriad ap Elidyr	Rhain ap Maredudd; Dyfed; 796–808	Owain ap Maredudd; Dyfed; 808–810
Gwgon ap Meurig; Seisyllwg 849–872	Merfyn Frych; Gwynedd; 825–844	Nest ferch Cadell	Cyngen ap Cadell; Powys; 808–855	Triffyn ap Rhain; Dyfed; 810–814	Tangwystl	Bleddri
Angharad ferch Meurig	Rhodri the Great Gwynedd; 844–878; Powys 855–878	Elisedd ap Cyngen	Hyfaidd ap Bleddri; Dyfed
Anarawd ap Rhodri; Gwynedd; 878–916	Tudwal Gloff	Merfyn ap Rhodri; Powys; 878–900	Cadell ap Rhodri b.854 Seisyllwg; 878–909	Llywarch ap Hyfaidd; Dyfed; 893–904	Rhodri ap Hyfaidd; Dyfed; 904–905
Idwal Foel; Gwynedd; 916–942	Alser ap Tudwal	Llywelyn ap Merfyn; Powys; 900–942	Hywel Dda b.880 Dyfed; 905–909; Deheubarth; 909–950; Gwynedd; 942–950; Powys; 942–950	Elen ferch Llywarch
Meurig ap Idwal	Iago ap Idwal; Gwynedd; 950–979	Ieuaf ap Idwal; Gwynedd; 950–969	Rhodri ap Hywel; Deheubarth; 950–953	Owain ap Hywel; Deheubarth; 950–987	Edwin ap Hywel; Deheubarth; 950–954
Idwal ap Meurig	Hywel ap Ieuaf; Gwynedd; 979–985	Cadwallon ab Ieuaf; Gwynedd; 985–986	Einion ab Owain d.984	Maredudd ab Owain; Deheubarth; 987–999; Gwynedd; 986–999
Iago ab Idwal ap Meurig; Gwynedd; 1023–1039	Cynan ap Hywel; Gwynedd; 999–1005	Aeddan ap Blegywryd; Gwynedd; 1005–1018	Edwin ab Einion; Deheubarth; 1005–1018	Cadell ab Einion; Deheubarth; 1005–1018	Cynfyn ap Gwerstan	Angharad ferch Maredudd	Llywelyn ap Seisyll; Gwynedd; 1018–1023; Deheubarth; 1018–1023	Rhydderch ap Iestyn; Deheubarth; 1023–1033
Cynan ab Iago; 1014–1063	Trahaearn ap Caradog; Gwynedd; 1075–1081	Owain ab Edwin	Hywel ab Edwin; Deheubarth; 1033–1044	Tewdwr ap Cadell	Rhiwallon ap Cynfyn; 1020–1069	Bleddyn ap Cynfyn; Gwynedd; 1063–1075; Powys; 1063–1075	Gruffydd ap Llywelyn; Gwynedd; 1039–1063; Powys; 1039–1063; Deheubarth; 1055–1063	Gruffydd ap Rhydderch; Deheubarth; 1045–1055
Gruffudd ap Cynan b.1055 Gwynedd; 1081–1137	Angharad ferch Owain; Deheubarth; 1065-1162	Maredudd ab Owain ab Edwin; Deheubarth; 1063–1072	Rhys ab Owain; Deheubarth; 1072–1078	Rhys ap Tewdwr; Deheubarth; 1078–1093	Gwladys ferch Rhiwallon	Iorwerth ap Bleddyn; Powys; 1075–1103	Maredudd ap Bleddyn; Powys; 1116–1132	Cadwgan ap Bleddyn; Powys; 1075–1111
Cadwaladr ap Gruffydd; 1096–1172	Gwenllian ferch Gruffydd; 1097–1136	Gruffydd ap Rhys; Deheubarth; 1116–1137	Nest ferch Rhys; 1085–1136	Susanna ferch Gruffydd	Madog ap Maredudd; Powys; 1132–1160	Gruffydd ap Maredudd	Owain ap Cadwgan; Powys; 1111–1116
Owain Gwynedd b.1100 Gwynedd; 1137–1170	Cadell ap Gruffydd; Deheubarth; 1143–1153	Maredudd ap Gruffydd; Deheubarth; 1153–1155	Anarawd ap Gruffydd; Deheubarth; 1137–1143	Rhys ap Gruffydd b.1132 Deheubarth; 1155–1197	Gwenllian ferch Madog	Owain Cyfeiliog; Powys Wenwynwyn; 1160–1197
Hywel ab Owain Gwynedd b.1120 Gwynedd; 1170	Dafydd ab Owain Gwynedd; Gwynedd; 1170–1195 d. 1203	Maelgwn ab Owain Gwynedd; Gwynedd; 1170–1173	Cynan ab Owain Gwynedd	Rhodri ab Owain Gwynedd; 1135–1195	Gwenllian ferch Rhys	Gruffydd ap Rhys II; Deheubarth; 1197–1201	Rhys Gryg; Deheubarth; 1216–1234	Angharad ferch Owain Gwynedd	Gruffydd Maelor I Powys Fadog; 1160–1191
Iorwerth Drwyndwn; 1145–1174	Marared ferch Madog	Gruffudd ap Cynan ab Owain Gwynedd; 1150–1200	Maredudd ap Cynan ab Owain Gwynedd; 1150–1212	Tomas ap Rhodri ab Owain Gwynedd (see Anwyl of Tywyn family)	Maelgwn ap Rhys; Deheubarth; 1201–1230	Gwenllian ferch Rhys	Ednyfed Fychan; 1170–1246	Madog ap Gruffydd Maelor; Powys Fadog; 1191–1236	Gwenwynwyn; Powys Wenwynwyn; 1197–1216
Tangwystl Goch	Llywelyn the Great b.1173 Gwynedd; 1195–1240; Powys; 1216–1240	Joan Plantagenet, Lady of Wales	Llywelyn the Elder ap Maredudd	Goronwy ab Ednyfed; 1205–1268	Owain ap Gruffudd	Maredudd ap Rhys Grug d.1271	Gruffydd II ap Madog; Powys Fadog; 1236–1269	Gruffydd ap Gwenwynwyn; Powys Wenwynwyn; 1241–1287
Gruffydd ap Llywelyn; 1200–1244	Dafydd ap Llywelyn b.1215 Wales; 1240–1246	Angharad ferch Llywelyn	Maelgwn Fychan	Maredudd ap Llywelyn d. 1255	Rhys ap Maredudd; 1250–1292	Owen de la Pole; 1257–1293
Llywelyn ap Gruffudd b.1223 Wales; 1246–1282	Owain Goch ap Gruffydd d. 1282; Gwynedd; 1246–1255	Dafydd ap Gruffydd b.1238 Wales; 1282–1283	Rhodri ap Gruffudd; 1230–1315	Llywelyn ap Maredudd d.1263	Tudur Hen d.1311	Maredydd ab Owain	Elen ferch Maelgwn	Gruffydd de la Pole d.1309
Catherine ferch Llywelyn	Llywelyn ap Dafydd; 1267–1287	Owain ap Dafydd; 1265–1325	Tomas ap Rhodri; 1300–1363	Madog ap Llywelyn claimant 1294–1295	Goronwy ap Tudur Hen d.1331	Owain ap Maredydd	Gruffudd Fychan I Powys Fadog; 1277–1283	Madog II ap Gruffydd; Powys Fadog; 1269–1277
Owain Lawgoch; 1330–1378	Llywelyn ab Owain	Madog Crypl; 1275–1304
Eleanor Goch	Tomas ap Llewelyn	Gruffydd of Rhuddallt; 1296–1343
Tudur ap Goronwy d.1367	Marged ferch Tomos	Elen ferch Tomos	Gruffudd Fychan II d. 1369
Maredudd ap Tudur d.1406
Owen Tudor; 1400–1461	Owain Glyndŵr claimant 1400–1415
House of Tudor
