= 9th century in Wales =

This article is about the particular significance of the century 801–900 to Wales and its people.

== Events ==
830

- Approximate date – Nennius's Historia Brittonum

878

- Merfyn ap Rhodri succeeds his father Rhodri the Great as king of Powys, reigning until his own death in c.900

893

- Spring – Battle of Buttington, a victory for a joint Anglo-Saxon and Welsh force against the Vikings; the Buttington Oak, planted about this time, perhaps to commemorate the event, falls in 2018
- Autumn – Danish Vikings are forced from Chester into Wales.

== Births ==
854

- Cadell ap Rhodri, King of Seisyllwg (died 909)

== Deaths ==
808

- Cadell ap Brochfael, king of Powys

809

- Elfodd, bishop of Gwynedd, who persuaded the Welsh church to adopt the Roman method of determining the date of Easter

844

- Merfyn Frych, king of Gwynedd

855

- Cyngen ap Cadell, king of Powys

871

- Gwgon, king of Ceredigion and Ystrad Tywi

878

- Rhodri the Great, king of Gwynedd and most of Wales (born c. 820)
