= Ingimundr (tenth century) =

Viking warlord

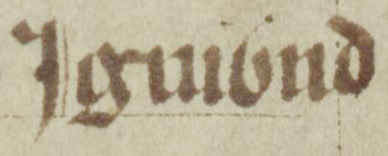
Ingimundr's name as it appears on folio 58v of Oxford Jesus College MS 111 (the Red Book of Hergest): "Jgmỽnd".

Ingimundr, also known as Hingamund, Igmunt, Ingimund, was a tenth century Viking warlord. In 902, Irish sources record that the Vikings were driven from Dublin. It is almost certainly in the context of this exodus that Ingimundr appears on record. He is recorded to have led the abortive settlement of Norsemen on Anglesey, before being driven out from there as well. He appears to have then led his folk to the Wirral peninsula, where the English allowed him to settle his followers. Ingimundr's invasion of Anglesey may be the most notable Viking attack in Welsh history.

== Exodus from Ireland, and conflict with the Welsh ==
The Viking Kingdom of Dublin was established in the mid-ninth century. This maritime realm weakened from infighting in the later part of the century, and following a devastating defeat to a united force from the kingdoms of Brega and Leinster, the Vikings were finally driven from Dublin in 902 specifically, according to the Annals of Ulster, and Chronicon Scotorum, by the Irish. The pseudo-historical Fragmentary Annals of Ireland relates a colourful tale concerning Ingimundr that clearly relates to this expulsion. According to this source, Ingimundr led an exodus of Vikings from Ireland to Anglesey, before they were driven from the island, after which they were settled by the English near Chester.

The Annales Cambriae and Brut y Tywysogyon appear to corroborate the thrust of the aforesaid account of Ingimundr in Wales. According to the former, Ingimundr came to Anglesey and held "Maes Osmeliaun", whilst the Welsh vernacular chronicle reports that Ingimundr held "Maes Ros Meilon". The site itself appears to have been located on the eastern edge of Anglesey, perhaps near Llanfaes if the aforesaid place names are any clue. Another possibility is that Ingimundr was settled near Llanbedrgoch, where evidence of farming, manufacturing, and trading has been excavated. There is reason to suspect that this site formed an aristocratic power centre, and that it may have originated as an informal Viking trading centre just prior to Ingimundr's attempted colonisation. The centre itself could have provided an important staging post between the Welsh and other trading centres in the Irish Sea region. (Note: One particular archaeological find on Anglesey is that of the arm-rings uncovered at Red Wharf Bay. These objects are likely contemporaneous with the Cuerdale Hoard, and therefore contemporaneous with Ingimundr's occupation of the island. In fact, it is possible that Ingimundr's actions on Anglesey resulted in the original deposit of this hoard, and it's non-recovery.)

According to the version of events presented in the Fragmentary Annals of Ireland, Ingimundr had been defeated by a son of Cadell ap Rhodri. If correct, this son could have been one of the latter's sons, either Hywel Dda or Clydog. According to the so-called "Nennian" recension of Historia Brittonum, however, Cadell's brother, Anarawd ap Rhodri (died 916), held the kingship of Anglesey in about 908, in addition to his kingship of Gwynedd on the Welsh mainland. The Fragmentary Annals of Ireland, therefore, could well have replaced Anarawd's apparent connection in the ousting of Ingimundr from Anglesey, in favour his more famous nephew, Hywel Dda.

The slaying of Anarawd's brother, Merfyn, about the year after Ingimundr's clash on Anglesey, as revealed by Brenhinedd y Saesson, Brut y Tywysogyon, and Annales Cambriae, may be directly related to Ingimundr's activities along the Welsh coast. Although the former two sources state that Merfyn was put to death by his own men, the latter source identifies his killers as Vikings, and it is possible that confusion concerning the Latin words gentibus and gentilibus are responsible for the discrepancy between the sources.

== Settlement in Mercia, and strife against the English ==
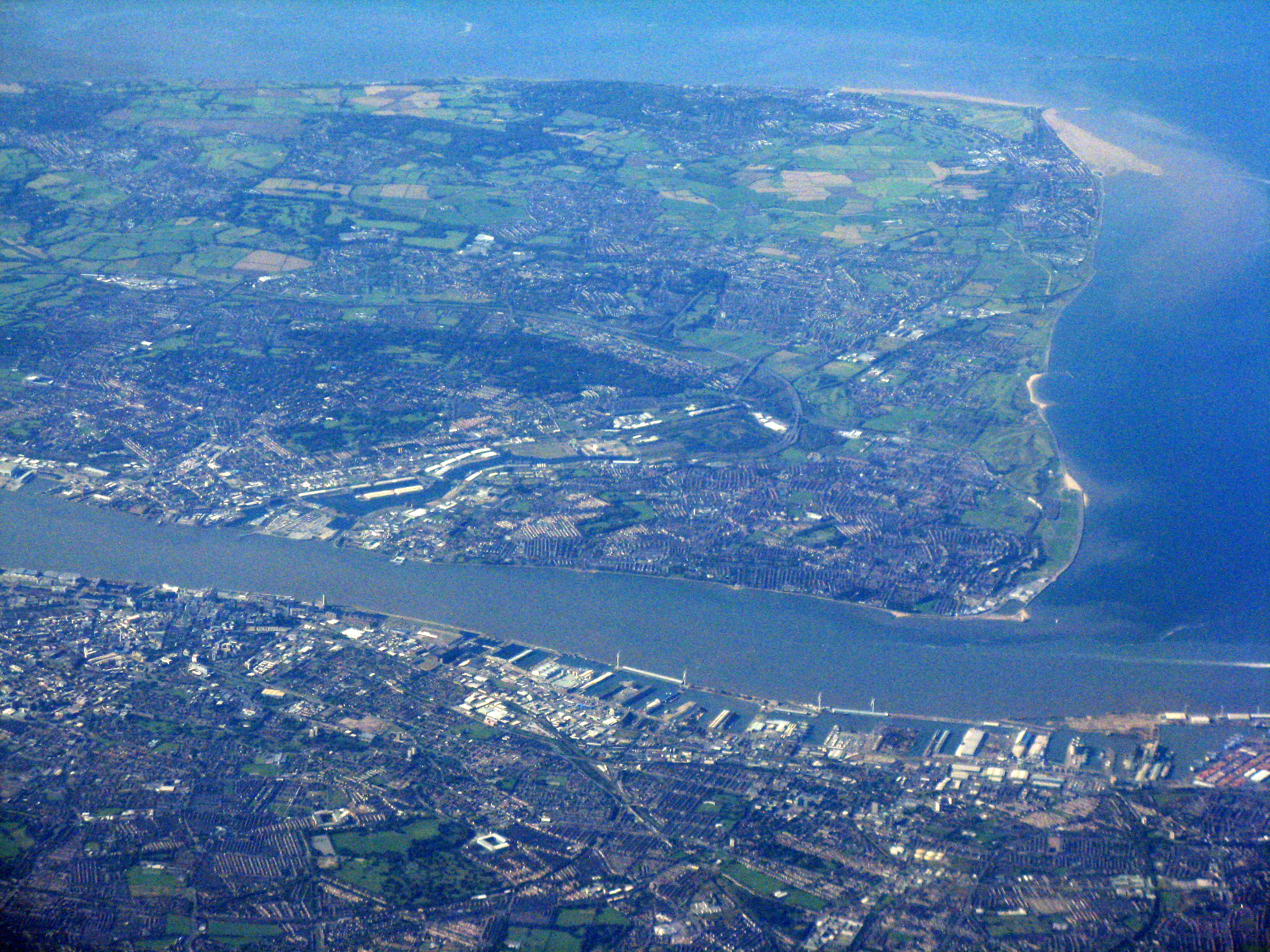
The northern tip of the Wirral peninsula looking west from a position over Liverpool.

Following Ingimundr's apparent expulsion from Anglesey, the Fragmentary Annals of Ireland claim that he and his followers settled in Mercian lands around Chester with the consent of Æðelflæd, co-ruler of Mercia (died 918). Although the source itself is of questionable reliability, and there is no English source that corroborates such a grant—with this region being within a virtual "blind-spot" as regards its lack of coverage in coetaneous sources—some of Æðelflæd's continental contemporaries were certainly involved with strategically settling Vikings in estuarial regions. Furthermore, there is an abundance of place name evidence on the Wirral peninsula, north-west of Chester, that attests to a significant Scandinavian colony in the region. It is almost certain, therefore, that Ingimundr settled his followers on the Wirral between the Dee and Mersey estuaries (Note: There is also genetic evidence of Scandinavian settlement on the peninsula.), and struck a deal with Æthelflæd in which he was bound to safeguard the surrounding region from unwelcome Viking activity. In fact, there is a remarkable lack of archaeological evidence of Viking activity in Cheshire, east of the Wirral, which may have bearing upon such an arrangement with the English.

If the Fragmentary Annals of Ireland is to be believed, the Mercians' plans of making use of such settlement may have backfired as Ingimundr later turned against the English, and convinced other leading Vikings to aid him in what was an unsuccessful assault on Chester itself. Although this episode is clearly over-dramatised, the B and C versions of the Anglo-Saxon Chronicle reveal that Æðelflæd restored the Roman defences of Chester in 907, whilst the C version further records the construction of byrig (fortified settlements) at Eddisbury and Runcorn in 914 and 915 respectively. Æðelflæd's restoration of Chester, therefore, may have been undertaken in the face of the threat posed by the significant influx of Scandinavian settlers in the region. Specifically, this restoration could have been undertaken before the apparent attack, or possibly begun as a direct response to such an attack. Æðelflæd's aforesaid restoration and construction projects of Eddisbury and Runcorn—as well as those of Thelwall (in 919), Manchester (in 919), and Cledemutha (perhaps Rhuddlan; in 921)—need not have been initiated as a means to counter the threat of substantial Viking settlement, but could have been undertaken with the Welsh in mind. Whatever the case, the remark by the Fragmentary Annals of Ireland, that Ingimundr convened with the Viking leadership before hostilities were commenced, could conceivably reflect deliberations carried out at the local þing (assembly site) located in Thingwall (a place name derived from the Old Norse þing-vǫllr, "assembly-field").

At one point the tenth-century Armes Prydein makes reference to a great military alliance of peoples that included Gwyðyl Iwerðon, Mon, a Phrydyn ("Gaels of Ireland, Anglesey, and Pictland"). If this remark represents Gaelic speakers, it could refer to Irish colonists on Anglesey who had arrived as a direct result of Ingimundr's abortive immigration from Ireland, or at least as a consequence of his settlement on the island. The expulsion of the Vikings from Dublin in 902 appears to have resulted in Viking immigration in the Wirral and on Anglesey, but also on Mann, and along the coasts of Cumbria and northern Wales. Although this expansion cannot be solely attributed to the refugees from Dublin, it was their expulsion that appears to have precipitated this new wave of Viking colonisation in the Irish Sea region. The Fragmentary Annals of Ireland asserts that some of Ingimundr's forces in England were Irishmen. In fact, there may well be truth behind this claim as the place name Irby, meaning "farm of the Irish", is found on the Wirral.

== Aftermath and Agmund ==
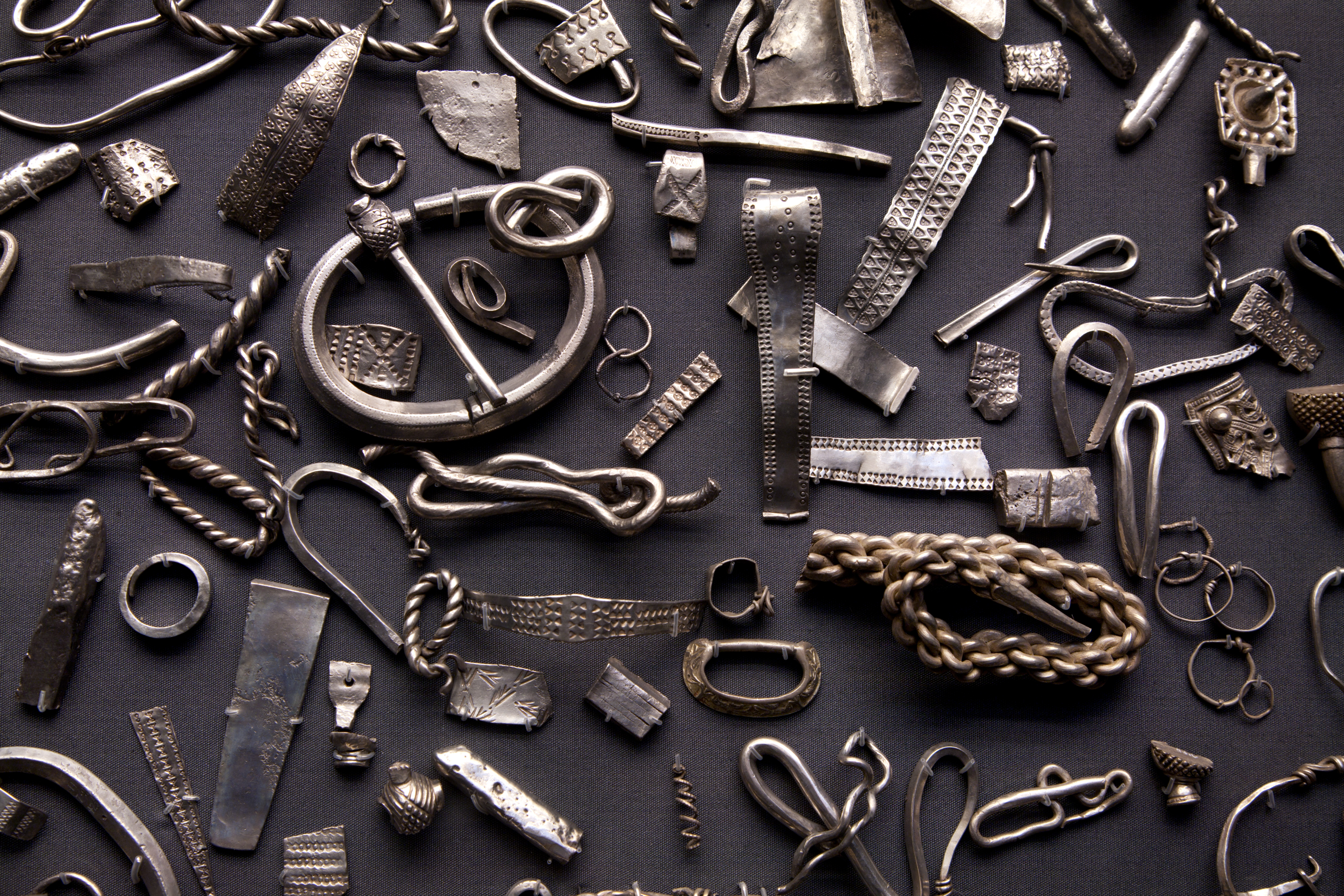
The Cuerdale Hoard of hack-silver was uncovered in Lancashire about 65 km (40 mi) from Chester, and dates from about the time of Ingimundr's floruit on the British mainland.

Although Ingimundr's settlement on the Wirral appears to be the only specifically documented migration in the wake of the events of 902, his adventure was almost certainly not unique. No doubt other middle-ranking Viking lords settled followers along in the Irish Sea region, in places such as Cumbria, Galloway, Lancashire, and Mann. Although the expulsion of 902 may have led to a brief abatement of violent Viking activity in Ireland, within two decades there was a remarkable resurgence of such activity, and Dublin itself was retaken and restored in 917.

It is possible that Ingimundr is identical to a certain "Agmund hold" who is accounted as one of the slain combatants of the Battle of Tettenhall by the C and D versions of the Anglo-Saxon Chronicle, and to the similarly named man who was the eponym of Amounderness. Against this identification is the fact Ingimundr appears to have borne a different personal name than these individuals. In fact, these two Agmunds may well be identical, and their names appear to correspond to the Old Norse Agmundr rather than Ingimundr. (Note: Amounderness is first recorded in a somewhat dubious early tenth-century charter. Early forms of the name indicate that it originated from the Old Norse *Agmundarnes ("Agmundr's headland"). A variant form of the personal name Agmundr is Ǫgmundr.) As on the Wirral, there is an abundance of Scandinavian place names in Amounderness (an area which corresponds to today's administrative districts of Fylde, Wyre, Preston and part of Ribble Valley, Lancashire), and it was in the southern part of this district near Preston where the Cuerdale Hoard was originally deposited. The Scandinavian settlement of this region, like that of the Wirral, was a by-product of the 902 exodus from Ireland.
