= Angharad ferch Meurig =

Welsh princess

- Born: Wales
- Spouse: Rhodri the Great
- Issue: Anarawd ap Rhodri; Cadell ap Rhodri; Merfyn ap Rhodri
- House: House of Cunedda
- Father: Meurig ap Dyfnwal

Angharad ferch Meurig (fl. c. 875 CE) was a 9th-century Welsh noblewoman. She was the wife of Rhodri the Great of Gwynedd, and was the mother of Anarawd (Rhodri's successor), Cadell ap Rhodri, and Merfyn.

== Life ==
Angharad was the daughter of Meurig ap Dyfnwallon of the Kingdom of Ceredigion, who was evidently the King of Seisyllwg in southwestern Wales. She was a descendant of Cunedda through his son, Ceredig ap Cunedda of Ceredigion through her paternal line. She was married to Rhodri Mawr of Gwynedd, (d. 878) son of Merfyn Frych, who held power over much of Wales. She had at least three sons, Anarawd, Cadell and Merfyn, although Rhodri is recorded in having six sons in some sources. She may have had a daughter called Nest.

Her brother Gwgon ap Meurig succeeded their father to the throne of Seisyllwg, but he drowned without an heir in either 871 or 872, crossing the River Llychwr in Gower while fighting "black pagans" interpreted to mean Viking invaders.

Subsequently, Angharad and Rhodri are considered to have become caretakers of his kingdom through her blood rights. Rhodri had no standing to take the kingship himself, but Angharad's family connection allowed him to install their second son, Cadell (d. 910), as king. Their first son, Anarawd, later succeeded Rhodri in Gwynedd. Their third son, Merfyn, is sometimes said to have been installed as King of Powys.

Through her son Cadell, Angharad became the grandmother of Hywell ap Cadell, more commonly known as Hywel Dda, king of Deheubarth (originally Ceredigion, Seisyllwg and Dyfed). He later ruled over most of Wales, and was responsible for the codification of traditional Welsh laws known as the Laws of Hywel Dda.
