= Ithel ap Hywel =

Ithel or Idwal ap Hywel (died c. 843) was a king of Gwent in southeastern medieval Wales. He was called king of Gwent and Morgannwg (i.e., Glywysing) by the Chronicle of the Princes.

Along with his brother Meurig, Ithel assisted King Rhodri the Great of Gwynedd against the invasions of Beorhtwulf, earl of Mercia, and his brother "Ithelwlf". According to the Annals of Wales, Ithel's death preceded his brother's; according to the Chronicle, his death followed Meurig's. Both sources agree, however, that Ithel's demise was occasioned by the treachery of the men of Brycheiniog. The act was so infamous that the treason of the men of Brycheiniog became proverbial in medieval Wales. The Chronicle placed Ithel's death in its entry for AD 843; Phillimore's reconstruction of the dating of the A text of the Annals of Wales dated its entry to 848.

This Ithel seems to have been the original namesake of the church at St Illtyd in Monmouthshire, although his cult was never sanctioned by the Catholic Church and the church's dedication was later altered.
