= Merfyn ap Rhodri =

9th century Aberffraw prince of Gwynedd

Merfyn ap Rhodri (died c. 900) was a late 9th century prince of Gwynedd of the royal House of Aberffraw. He is sometimes credited with ruling the Kingdom of Powys after the death of his father Rhodri Mawr (Rhodri the Great) in 878. He was a paternal uncle of Hywel Dda and a grandson of Merfyn Frych (d. 844) and Nest ferch Cadell ap Brochwel.

Merfyn was a younger son of Rhodri Mawr, son of Merfyn Frych and Angharad ferch Meurig, daughter of Meurig ap Dyfnwallon of the Kingdom of Ceredigion, who was the King of Seisyllwg in south western Wales. His mother Angharad was a descendant of Cunedda, founder of the Kingdom of Gwynedd, through his son, Ceredig ap Cunedda of Ceredigion through her paternal line. Mervyn's father Rhodri held power over much of Wales. He had at least two full brothers, Anarawd ap Rhodri (d. 916) and Cadell ap Rhodri (854–909), although his father Rhodri is recorded in having six sons in some sources. Merfyn may have had a full sister called Nest.

On the death of their father, Anarawd became King of Gwynnedd. Cadell had been installed as King of Seisyllwg in south east Wales after the death by drowning of the brother's maternal uncle Gwgon ap Meurig, in either 871 or 872. Gwgon is recorded as dying whilst crossing the River Llychwr in Gower while fighting "black pagans" interpreted to mean Viking invaders. Cadell inherited the throne as Gwgon died without an heir.

Merfyn's inheritance is less clear in the historical record. In the accounts where he is credited as a king, Merfyn is reported to have lost his realm of Powys to an invasion by his brother Cadell, King of Ceredigion, whose expansionist policies built the foundations for the creation of the Kingdom of Dehubarth by his son Hywel Dda. Merfyn's death may be connected to the incursion into Anglesey by the Viking Ingimundr in the first decade of the 10th century.

The drowning of Merfyn's son Haearnddur, or "Haardur", was reported by both the Chronicle of the Princes and the Annals of Wales. The first places it in the year 953; Phillimore's reconstruction of the latter's dating would place it in 956.

== See also ==
- Family tree of Welsh monarchs

Preceded by Rhodri Mawr	King of Powys; 878–900	Succeeded by Llywelyn ap Merfyn
