= List of rulers in Wales =

Medieval Welsh realms and their rulers

The following is a list of rulers of Wales (Welsh: Cymru; and neighbouring regions) during the Middle Ages, between the 5th and 16th centuries. These rulers were monarchs who ruled their respective realms, as well as those who briefly ruled the Principality of Wales. These former territories are now within the boundaries of modern-day Wales and the neighbouring Welsh Marches in England (both in the United Kingdom).

Before the Edwardian Conquest, completed in 1283, Wales consisted of several independent realms, the most important being Gwynedd, Powys, Deheubarth (which was formed from lands belonging to Ceredigion, Dyfed and latterly Seisyllwg) and Morgannwg (formed from Glywysing and Gwent). Boundary changes and the custom of dividing patrimonies between heirs meant that few princes ever came close to ruling the whole of Wales.

The names of those known to have ruled over one or more areas are listed below. Boundaries changed frequently. The only known native ruler of all of present-day Wales was Gruffudd ap Llywelyn (c. 1010–1063), a Prince of Gwynedd who became King of Wales from 1055 to 1063. However, some Welsh princes sporadically claimed the medieval title of "Prince of Wales" between the 13th to 15th centuries. The title remains in use but is given to heirs apparent of English and British monarchs.

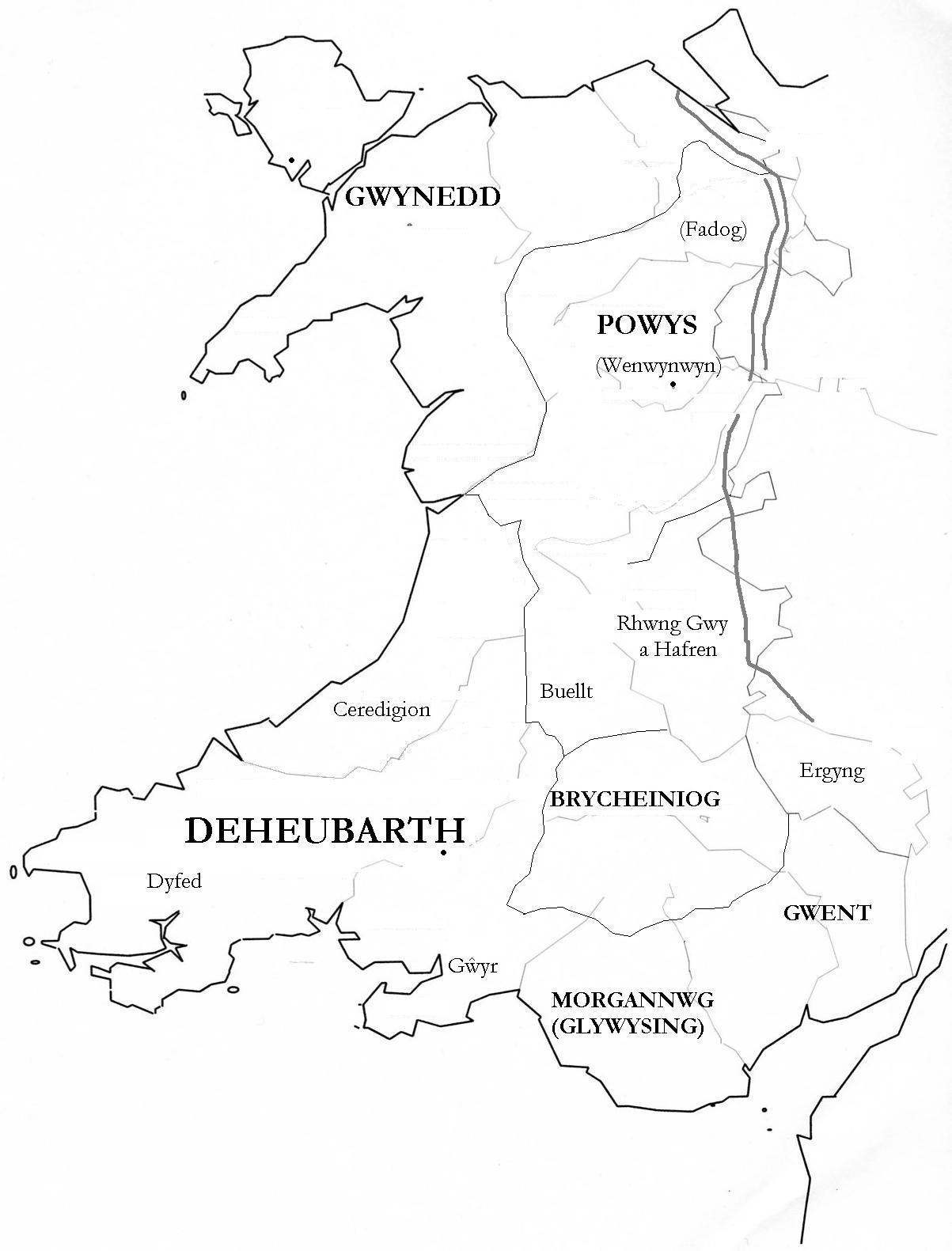
Map of medieval Wales

== History of the medieval kingdoms in Wales ==
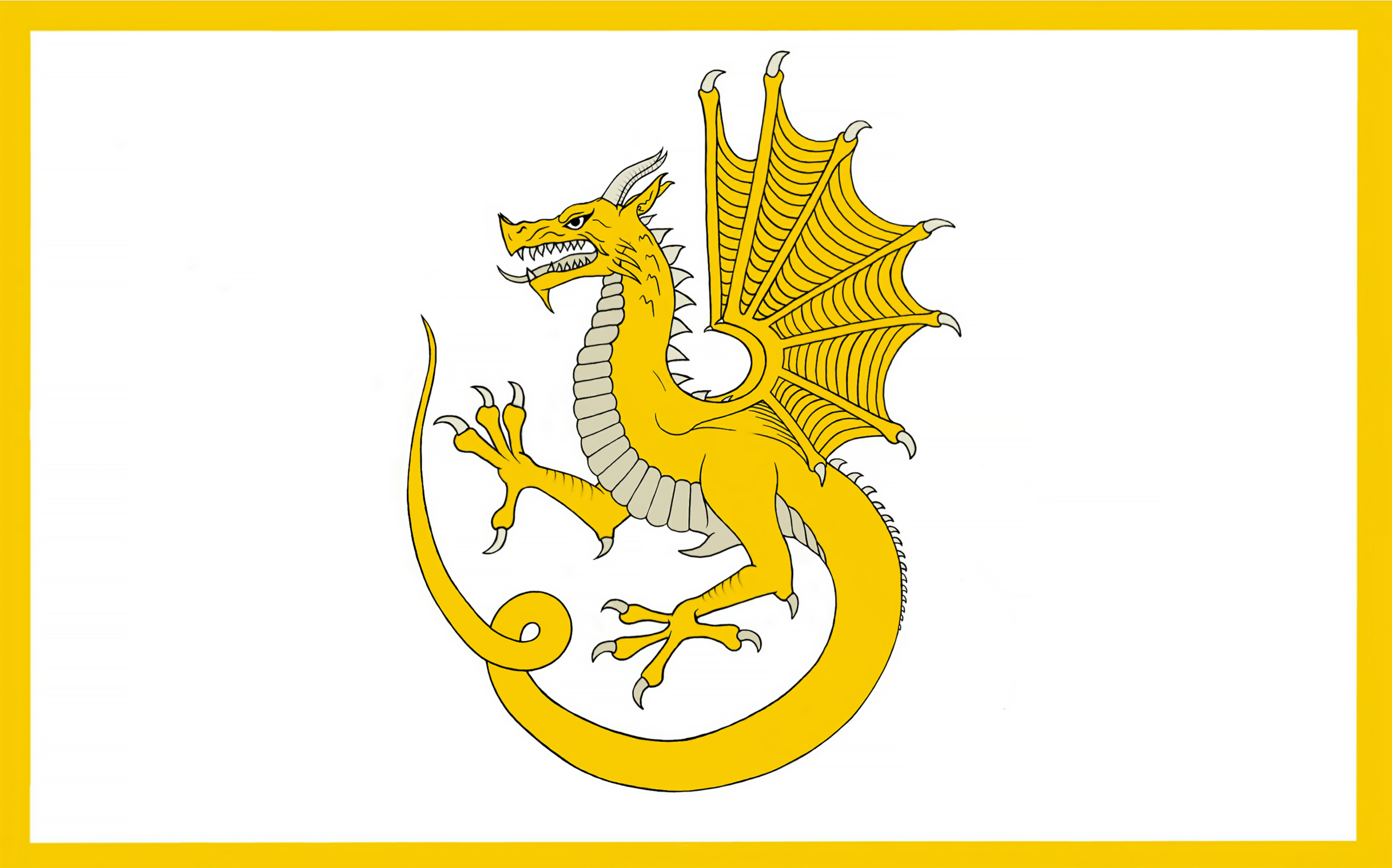
Owain Glyndwr's gold Welsh dragon flag

Wales during the medieval age was a land of kingdoms and dynasties. Petty kingdoms, such as Ceredigion and Gwent, were established some time after Britain ceased to be part of the Roman Empire in the late 5th century. By the time of the Norman invasion of Wales in the 11th century, most of these realms were combined or incorporated into greater territories, thus making up the four major kingdoms of Wales. Those kingdoms were Gwynedd, Powys, Deheubarth, and Morgannwg. Unlike the others, Deheubarth was formed later by the merging of Ceredigion, Dyfed, and Ystrad Tywi. Some minor (petty) kingdoms stayed independent from the big four kingdoms, only to be taken over by the Anglo-Normans in the 13th century, such as Rhwng Gwy a Hafren, Meirionnydd, and others. Of the major kingdoms, Powys' 13th-century division of Wenwynwyn and Fadog was one of the final surviving Welsh dynasties until after the Edwardian conquest of Wales. Later, Owain Glyndŵr became the final Welsh ruler from royalty in Wales; he emerged in Powys Fadog during the early 15th century as a Prince of Wales.

== Welsh kingdoms (400s–1000s) ==
Coats of arms of Kingdoms of Wales

Ceredigion

Dyfed

Gwent

Morgannwg

=== Kings of Brycheiniog ===
- Anlach mac Cormac;
- Brychan ab Anlach (c. 400 or 470) (Note: (Irish Bróccan) Claimed as founder of the ruling dynasty;)
- Rhain Dremrudd ap Brychan (c. 450);
- Tewdwr ap Rhain (c. 700);
- Nowy (c. 725);
- Gruffudd ap Nowy (c. 750).

=== Kings and princes of Ceredigion ===
- Ceredig ap Cunedda, c. 5th century (410);
- Usai ap Ceredig (c. 450);
- Serwyl ab Usai (c. 490);
- Boddw ap Serwyl (c. 530);
- Arthfoddw ap Boddw (c. 570);
- Arthlwys ab Arthfoddw (c. 610);
- Clydog ab Arthlwys (c. 650);
- Seisyll ap Clydog, King of Seisyllwg (c. 690, Ceredigion and Ystrad Tywi);
- Arthen ap Seisyll (d. 807);
- Dyfnwallon ab Arthen (c. 750);
- Meurig ap Dyfnwallon (c. 780);
- Gwgon ap Meurig (d. 872).

=== Kings and princes of Dyfed ===
- Triffyn Farfog (c. 430)
- Aergol Lawhir (c. 460)
- Vortiporius
- Cloten (c. 600, Gwlyddein ap Nowy ap Arthur)
- Maredudd ap Tewdwr (d. 796)
- Rhain ap Maredudd (d. 808)
- Owain ap Maredudd (d. 811)
- Triffyn ap Rhain (d. 814)
- Hyfaidd ap Bleddri (d. 893)
- Llywarch ap Hyfaidd (d. 904)
- Rhodri ap Hyfaidd (d. 905)

=== Kingdom of Gwynedd ===
==== Kings of Gwynedd ====
- Cunedda Wledig ap Edern (c. 370)
- Einion Yrth ap Cunedda (Einion 'the Strong'; c. 410)
- Cadwallon Lawhir ap Einion (Cadwallon 'of the Long Hand'; c. 440)
- Maelgwn Hir ap Cadwallon (Maelgwn 'the Tall'; Maelgwn Gwynedd; d. 547)
- Rhun Hir ap Maelgwn (Rhun 'the Tall'; c. 500)
- Beli ap Rhun
- Iago ap Beli (died c. 616)
- Cadfan ap Iago (c. 565)
- Cadwallon ap Cadfan (d. 634)
- Cadafael Cadomedd ap Cynfeddw (Cadfael 'the Battle-Shirker')
- Cadwaladr Fendigaid ap Cadwallon (Cadwaladr 'the Blessed'; died 664)
- Idwal Iwrch ap Cadwaladr (Idwal 'the Roebuck'; c. 660)
- Rhodri Molwynog ap Idwal (Rhodri 'the Bald and Grey'; d. 754)
- Caradog ap Meirion (d. 798, Prince of Rhos)
- Cynan Dindaethwy ap Rhodri (d. 816)
- Hywel ap Caradog
- Merfyn Frych ap Gwriad (d. 844)

==== Princes of Dogfeiling ====
- Dogfael ap Cunedda Wledig (c. 410)
- Elno ap Dogfael (c. 440)
- Glas ap Elno (c. 470)
- Elgud ap Glas ap Elno (c. 500)
- Elaeth ab Elgud (c. 530)
- Meurig ap Elaeth (c. 570)

==== Princes of Dunoding ====
- Dunod ap Cunedda Wledig (c. 400)
- Eifion ap Dunod ap Cunedda (c. 430)
- Dingad ap Eifion (c. 470)
- Meurig ap Dingad (c. 500)
- Eifion ap Meurig (c. 530)
- Issac ap Eifion ap Meurig (c. 570)
- Pobien Hen ap Isaac (c. 600)
- Pobddelw ap Pobien Hen (c. 630)
- Eifion ap Pobddelw (c. 670)
- Brochwel ap Eifion (c. 700)
- Eigion ap Brochwel ab Eifion (c. 730)
- Ieuanawl ab Eigion (c. 770)
- Caradog ap Ieuanawl (c. 800)
- Blieddud ap Caradog (c. 830)
- Cuhelyn ap Bleiddud (c. 870)

==== Princes of Penllyn ====
- Pebid 'Penllyn' (Note: 18 generations between Pebid and Meirion found in the Hanesyn Hen under Gwehelyth Penllyn)
- Sulbych ap Pebid 'Penllyn'
- Beblych ap Sulbych
- Gorflwng ap Beblych
- Cyndwlff ap Gorflwng
- Pandwlff ap Cyndwlff
- Ystader ap Pandwlff
- Puter ab Ystader
- Caper ap Puter
- Pybyr ap Caper
- Cadwr ap Pybyr
- Deiniog 'Lyth' ap Cadwr
- Dyfnwal ap Deiniog 'Lyth'
- Brochwel ap Dyfnwal
- Ednyfed ap Brochwel
- Tudwal ab Ednyfed
- Doned ap Tudwal
- Coed ap Doned
- Lleuddogw ap Coed
- Meirion ap Lleuddogw

==== Princes of Rhos ====
- Owain Ddantgwyn ap Einion Yrth (Rhos; c. 440)
- Cynlas Goch ab Owain Gwyn (c. 470, Rhos)
- St Einion (Llŷn) ap Owain (c. 470)
- Maig ab Owain ap Cynlas (c. 500)
- Cadal Crysban (c. 560, Crys-Halog)
- Idgwyn ap Cadwal Crysbyn (c. 590)
- Einion ab Idgwyn (c. 620)
- Rhufon ap Einion ap Idgwyn (c. 650)
- Hywel ap Rhufon (c. 680)
- Meirion ap Hywel ap Rhufon (c. 710)
- Hywel ap Caradog (c. 825, Hywel Farf-Fehinog)

==== Princes of Rhufoniog ====
- Rhufon ap Cunedda Wledig (c. 400)
- Breichiol (c. 830)
- Môr ap Breichiol (c. 870)
- Aeddan ap Môr (c. 900)
- Morudd ab Aeddan (c. 930)
- Môr ap Morudd (c. 970)

=== Kingdom of Morgannwg ===
==== Kings of Ergyng ====
Kingdom of Ergyng, in Wales and on the border of what is now Herefordshire, England.

- Peibio Clafrog ap Erb (c. 525), King of Ergyng
- Cynfyn ap Peibio (c. 550)
- Gwrfoddw
- Gwrgan Fawr ap Cynfyn (c. 650)

==== Kings of Ewyas ====
Regional Kingdom of Ewyas (Ewias) in Wales and Herefordshire, England.

- Clydog ap Clydwyn (grandson of Brychan c. 400)

==== Kings of Glywysing ====
- Glywys ap Solor (c. 430)
  - Pawl Penychen (c. 465)
  - Mechwyn, ruler of Gorfynydd, cantref of Glywysing
- Ithel ap Morgan (c. 690, reign 710–745)
- Hywel ap Rhys (d. 886?)
- Gruffydd ab Owain (King of Gower d. 934/5)
- Cadwgan ab Owain (King of Margam d. 949)
- Hywel ab Owain (King of Gwlad Forgan – Glamorgan d. 1043)

==== Prince of Glywysing ====
- Athrwys ap Meurig (c. 620)

==== Kings of Gwent ====
- Ynyr Gwent (c. 450)
- Caradoc ap Ynyr (c. 480)
- Ffernfael ab Idwal
- Ithel ap Hywel
  - Ffernafael ab Ithel ap Morgan (c. 775)
  - Meurig ap Hywel
  - Ffernfael ap Meurig
  - Brochwel ap Meurig (c. 830)
- Arthfael ap Hywel (c. 860)
- Ithel ab Athrwys ap Ffernfael (d. 848)
- Arthfael ap Noe (c. 930)
- Rhodri ab Elise
- Gruffudd ap Elise
- Edwyn ap Gwriad (c. 1020)

==== Rulers of Gwynllŵg ====
Kings and Lords in the cantref of Gwynllwg, in Glamorgan (Gwent).

- Gwynllyw ap Glywys (c. 460), ruler of Gwynllwg, cantref of Glywysing
  - Saint Cadoc (c. 495), son of Gwynllyw, ruler of Gwynllwg

==== Kings of Morgannwg ====
The Kingdom of Morgannwg was formed by the merging of the two kingdoms of Morgannwg and Gwent. At times, the kingdoms were separate and independent.

- Ithel ab Athrwys ab Meurig (c. 650)
- Owain, King of Morgannwg (c. 930)
- Morgan Hen ab Owain (d. 974)
- Owain ap Morgan Hen (c. 974)

=== Kingdom of Powys ===
==== Kings of Powys ====
- Gwrtheyrn (c. 365 High-King Vortigern), ruled Buellt and Gwrtheyrnion
  - Cadeyrn Fendigaid (or Catigern, c. 400; son of Gwrtheyrn)
    - Cadell Ddyrnllug (c. 430; son of Cadeyrn)
      - Cyngen Glodrydd (c. 460; son of Cadell)
    - Rhuddfedel Frych (430?; son of Cadeyrn)
  - Pasgen ap Gwrtheyrn (or Pascent, c. 400), ruled Buellt and Gwrtheyrnion
    - Mawgan ap Pasgen (c. 430)
- Brochwel Ysgithrog (c. 490)
- Cynan Garwyn (c. 520)
- Selyf ap Cynan (c. 550, Selyf Sarffgadau)
- Manwgan ap Selyf (c. 580, Mael Myngan ap Selyf Sarffgadau)
- Eiludd Powys
- Beli ab Eiludd, son of Manwgan/Myngan
- Gwylog ap Beli (c. 640)
- Elisedd ap Gwylog (c. 680)
- Brochfael ab Elisedd (c. 705 Brochwel ab Elise)
- Cadell ap Brochfael ab Aeddan
- Cyngen ap Cadell ap Brochwel (died 855)

===== Descendants of Rhodri Mawr =====
- Merfyn ap Rhodri (d. 904)
- Llywelyn ap Merfyn (c. 870)

==== Pengwern ====
The former petty Kingdom of Pengwern, today located in the Midlands, possibly around the Wrekin, England.

- Cyndrwyn (c. 535)
- Cynddylan ap Cyndrwyn (fl. 642)

=== Welsh regional kingdoms ===
==== All of Wales ====
Overlord of Wales (King of Wales) as a modern territory by 1055.

- Gruffydd ap Llywelyn (c. 1039–1063)

==== North Wales ====
Kings and Princes of the Kingdoms of Gwynedd and Powys.

- Iago ab Idwal (d. 942)
- Bleddyn ap Cynfyn (d. 1075)
- Rhiwallon ap Cynfyn (d. 1070)

==== South Wales ====
- Cadell ap Rhodri (878–910)

==== Kings and princes of Buellt and Gwrtheyrnion ====
- Pasgen ap Gwrtheryn, son of Vortigern (c. 400, Pascent)}
- Pawl ap Mepurit (c. 510)
- Eldog ap Pawl (c. 550)
- Eldad ab Eldog ap Paul (c. 590)
- Morudd ab Eldad (c. 630)
- Pasgen Buellt ap Gwyddaint (c. 700)
- Tewdwr ap Pasgen (c. 730)
- Gloud ap Pasgn Buellt (c. 730)
- Ffernfael ap Tewdwr (c. 760, Theodore)

==== Ceredigion, Meirionnydd, Gwynedd ====
King of an enlarged Gwynedd (also Rhos and Rhufoniog), including Ceredigion (Deheubarth), Meirionnydd and Dyffryn Clwyd, making his realm North West and West Wales.

- Gruffudd ap Cynan (c. 1081–1137), King of Gwynedd

==== Deheubarth, Gwynedd ====
Kingdoms in the west and northwest of Wales.

- Maredudd ab Owain (Owain ap Hywel's son, d. 999)
- Aeddan ap Blegywryd (d. 1018)
- Llywelyn ap Seisyll (d. 1023)

==== Deheubarth, Gwynedd, Powys ====
North and Mid to Southwest Wales.

- Rhodri Mawr (872–878)

==== Dyfed, Brycheiniog (Rheinwg) ====
- Cathen ap Gwlyddein (c. 625)
- Cadwgon ap Cathen (c. 650)
- Rhain ap Cadwgan (c. 675, Cadwgon), and Ystrad Tywi

==== Dyfed, Gwynedd, Powys, Seisyllwg ====
King of all of Wales, except for Morgannwg and Gwent (south and southeast of Wales).

- Hywel Dda (English: Hywel the Good) (d. 950)

==== Ergyng, Gwent ====
- Erb (c. 500)

==== Glywysing, Gwent ====
Southeast of Wales.

- Tewdrig (Glywysing and Gwent, c. 575)
- Meurig ap Tewdrig (Glywysing and Gwent c. 590)
- Morgan ab Athrwys (Glywysing and Gwent c. 650)
- Meurig ab Ithel (c. 720, reign 745–775)
- Arthfael Hen ap Rhys (English: Arthfael the Old, c. 760)
- Owain ap Hywel (c. 860)
- Caradog ap Gruffydd (d. 1081)
- Iestyn ap Gwrgan(t) (c. 1081–1093, Lord of Glamorgan)

==== Gwent, Morgannwg ====
South and Southeast of Wales.

- Meurig ap Hywel (Gwent and Morgannwg)
- Cadwgan ap Meurig (Gwent and Morgannwg)

== Welsh royal houses (870s–1283) ==
The three royal houses of Wales' regions were first divided by Rhodri the Great in the 9th century. Two of his sons founded royal dynasties: Anarawd reigned in Gwynedd (Aberffraw), and Cadell founded Deheubarth (Dinefwr). Another son Merfyn reigned in Powys (Mathrafal emerged as a cadet branch of Dinefwr in the 11th century).

Coat of Arms of Royal Houses of Wales.

Aberffraw, Gwynedd

Dinefwr, Deheubarth

Mathrafal, Powys

=== Aberffraw ===
==== Aberffraw kings of Gwynedd ====
- Anarawd ap Rhodri (d. 916)
- Idwal Foel ab Anarawd (English: Idwal the Bald, d. 942)
- Ieuaf ab Idwal (d. 988)
- Iago ab Idwal (d. 979)
- Hywel ab Ieuaf (d. 985)
- Cadwallon ab Ieuaf (d. 986)
- Cynan ap Hywel (d. 1003)
- Iago ab Idwal ap Meurig (d. 1039)
- Dafydd ab Owain Gwynedd (c. 1170–1195)

==== Aberffraw king of Ceredigion ====
- Hywel ab Owain Gwynedd (d. 1170)

==== Aberffraw prince of Anglesey ====
- Maelgwn ab Owain Gwynedd (d. 1173)

==== Aberffraw princes of Gwynedd ====
- Rhodri ab Owain Gwynedd (1175–1194, 1194–1195)
- Owain Goch ap Gruffydd (c. 1246–1255, English: Owain the Red)

=== Dinefwr ===
The Kingdom of Deheubarth was formed by the union of the Kingdoms of Ceredigion (also known as Seisyllwg) and Dyfed by Hywel Dda around 920.

==== Dinefwr kings of Deheubarth ====
- Owain ap Hywel (d. 988)
- Rhodri ap Hywel (d. 953)
- Edwin ap Hywel (d. 954)
- Rhydderch ap Iestyn (d. 1033)
- Hywel ab Edwin (d. 1044)
- Maredudd ab Owain ab Edwin (d. 1072)
- Rhys ab Owain ab Edwin (d. 1078)
- Rhys ap Tewdwr (c. 1078 – 1093)

==== Dinefwr princes of Deheubarth ====
- Gruffydd ap Rhys (c. 1090 – 1137)
- Anarawd ap Gruffydd (d. 1143)
- Cadell ap Gruffydd (d. 1175)
- Maredudd ap Gruffydd (c. 1130–1155)
- Gruffydd ap Rhys (d. 1201)
- Rhys Gryg (d. 1234, English: Rhys the Hoarse, also Welsh: Rhys Fychan)

=== Mathrafal ===
==== Mathrafal princes of Powys ====
- Iorwerth ap Bleddyn (d. 1111)
- Cadwgan ap Bleddyn (d. 1111)
- Owain ap Cadwgan (d. 1116)
- Maredudd ap Bleddyn Cynfyn
- Madog ap Maredudd (d. 1160)

===== Mathrafal prince of Powys Fadog =====
- Gruffydd Maelor I, son of Madog ap Maredudd (d. 1191)

===== Mathrafal princes of Powys Wenwynwyn =====
- Gruffudd, son of Maerdudd ap Bleddyn
- Owain Cyfeiliog (d. 1197)

== Welsh lordships (1000s–1500s) ==
The Lords of Welsh areas once belonging to monarchies. They were ruled by the direct descendants and heirs of Kings in Wales from around the time of the Norman invasion of Wales (1000s), some of which lasted until after the conquest of Wales by Edward I (c. 1300s), and in a few instances, Welsh baronies lasted later into the Principality of Wales.

Coat of Arms of the Lordships of Wales.

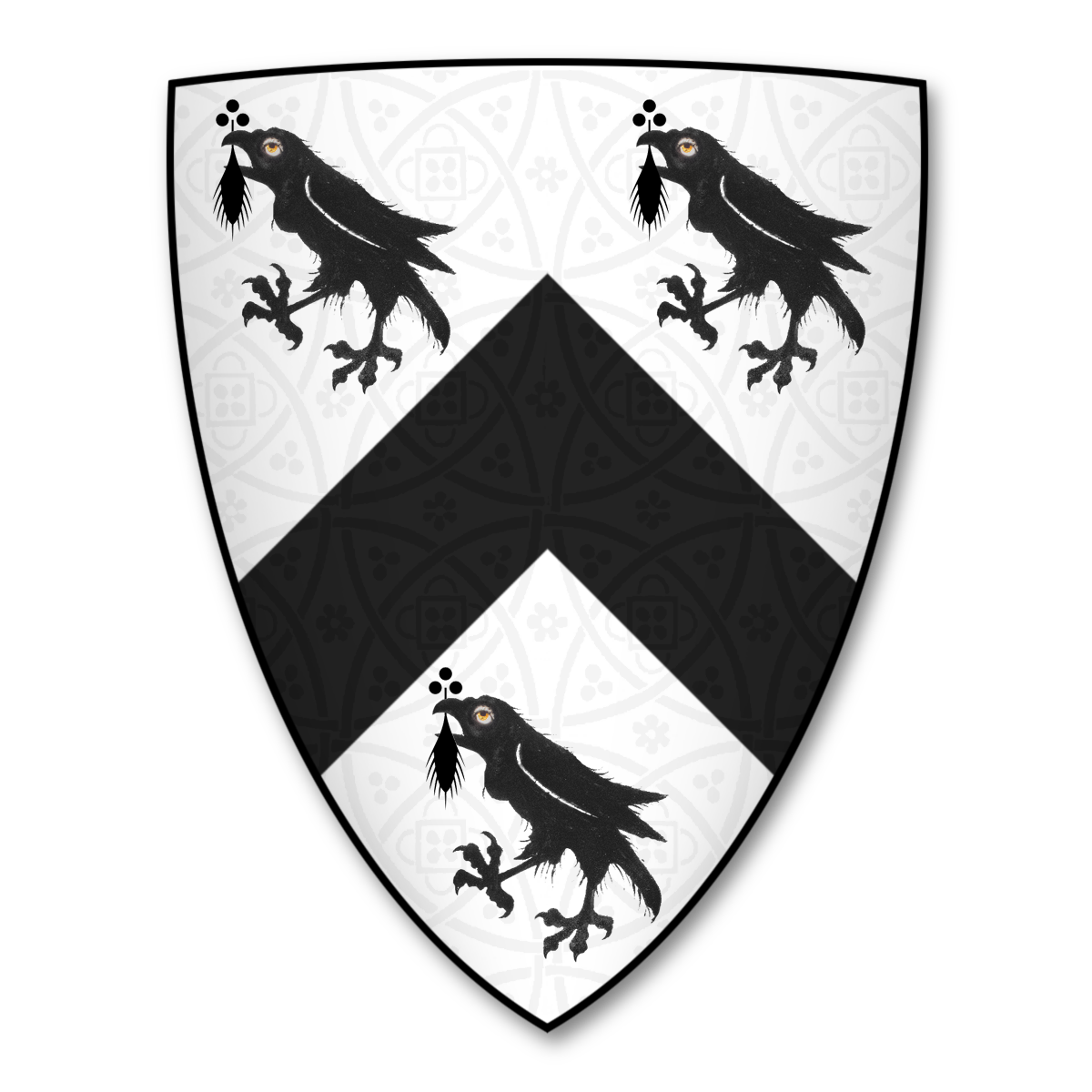
Menai

Nannau

Powys Fadog

Rhwng Gwy a Hafren

Tegeingl

Yale (Powys)

=== Lords of Afan ===
Listed Lords of Nedd-Avan (Avene, Welsh: Afan), dynasty of Glamorgan, Morgannwg (not the Norman Lordship of Glamorgan).

- Caradog ap Iestyn (c. 1130, son of Istyn ap Gwrgant)
- Owain ap Caradog, Lord of Afan
- Maerdudd, Lord of Miskin
- Morgan (d. 1208)
- Leision
- Morgan Gam (d. 1241)
- Morgan Fychan (d. 1288)
  - Rhys (Baglan)
  - Morgan
  - Lleision de Avene (d. 1238)
    - John de Avene
- Thomas de Avene

=== Lords of Arwystli and Cedewain ===
The regional territories as a dynasty combined the territories of Arwystli and Cedewain. The area was later incorporated into Powys Wenwynwyn.

- Trahaearn ap Caradog (1075–1081), King of Gwynedd
- Meurig, Lord of Arwystli (d. 1106)
- Griffri (d. 1106)
- Llywarch
- Owain
- Ieuaf (d. 1130)
- Hywel o'r Brithdir (d. 1185)
- Robert (d. 1171)
- Maredudd (d. 1244)
- Owain (d. 1261)

=== Lords of Caerleon ===
The rulers of Gwynllwg (Wentloog) and upper Gwent became the Lords of Caerleon.

- Gruffudd ap Rhydderch (d. 1055, King of Gwynllwg), son of Rhydderch ab Iestyn
- Caradog ap Gruffudd (d. 1081)
- Owain ap Caradog, Gwynllwg
- Morgan ab Owain (d. 1058), Lord of Caerleon
- Iorwerth ab Owain (c. 1171), Lord of Caerleon
- Hywel ab Iorwerth (c. 1210)
- Morgan ap Hywel (d. 1248)

=== Lords of Ceredigion ===
Lordship of Ceredigion, from the House of Dinefwr, Deheubarth.

- Maelgwn ap Rhys (c. 1170 – 1230) Lord of Ceredigion
- Maelgwn Fychan.

=== Lords of Mechain ===
Mechain, Powys.

- Owain Fychan (d. 1187) of Mechain, son of Prince Madog ap Maerdudd from Powys
- Owain Fychan (d. 1245)
- Llywelyn Fychan (d. before 1277), Lord of Mechain
- Gruffydd, Lord of Mechain
- Maredudd, Lord of Mechain

=== Lord of Menai ===
Lord of the Menai commote on Anglesey.

- Llywarch ap Bran (c. 1137), Lord of Menai (founder of one of the Fifteen Tribes of Wales)

=== Lords of Merioneth ===
The vassal Lordship of Merioneth (Meirionnydd) from Gwynedd, also Lords of Eifionydd and Ardudwy. Descendants of King Owain Gwynedd.

- Cynan ab Owain Gwynedd (d. 1174)
- Gruffudd ap Cynan ab Owain Gwynedd, Lord of Meirionnydd and Ardudwy
- Maredudd ap Cynan (d. 1212), Lord of Meirionnydd and Eifionydd and part of Ardudwy (Llŷn Peninsula)
- Llywelyn Fawr ap Maredudd, Lord of Merionieth (Merionethshire)
- Maredudd ap Llywelyn (d. 1255), Lord of Merioneth
- Llywelyn Fychan, Lord of Merioneth (father to Madog ap Llywelyn)

=== Lords of Nannau ===
Descendants of Madog ap Cadwgan ap Bleddyn, Prince of Powys. Lordship c. 1118 until the final Lord in the 1500s, before the use of the surname Nanney for the family.

- Madog, 1st Lord of Nannau (c. 1118–1121);
- Cadwgan;
- Madog;
- Meurig, Lord of Nannau;
- Ynyr Hen (c. 1200–1250);
- Ynyr Fychan (c. 1295);
- Meurig Fychan;
- Meurig Llwyd;
- Hywel Sele, 9th Lord (d. 1402, cousin of Owain Glyndwr);
- Meurig Fychan;
- Dafydd ap Meurig Fychan;
- Hywel ap Dafydd (Howel Nanney b. 1470);
- Gruffudd Wyn Nanney, 13th Lord (c. 1520).

=== Lords of Oswestry ===
Lords of Oswestry (Shropshire, England), from Powys, prior to the Baronetcy of Cymmer-yn-Edeirnion (English feudal barony).

- Prince Owain Brogyntyn of Powys (Mathrafal), Lord of Oswestry, Edeirnion and Dinmael (c. 1149 – 1157, d. 1188)
  - Bleddyn
  - Iorweth
    - Gruffudd, 1st Baron of Cymmer-yn-Edeirnion
  - Gruffudd

=== Lords of Powys Fadog ===
Northern Powys, House of Mathrafal.

- Madog ap Gruffydd Maelor Lord of Powys Fadog (d. 1238)
- Gruffydd Maelor (d. 1269), Lord of Castell Dinas Brân
- Madog II ap Gruffydd, Lord of Dinas Bran (d. 1277)
- Gruffudd Fychan I
- Madog Crypl
- Gruffydd of Rhuddalt, Lord of Glyndyfrdwy
- Gruffudd Fychan II (father of Glyndwr, b. 1354), Lord of Glyndyfrdwy

=== Lords of Powys Wenwynwyn ===
Southern Powys, House of Mathrafal. The lordship also had lands in Arwystli, Cyfeiliog, Mawddwy, and Caereinion.

- Gwenwynwyn (d. 1216), Lord of Powys Wenwynwyn, son of Prince Owain Cyfeiliog
- Gruffydd ap Gwenwynwyn (d. 1286)
- Owen de la Pole (d. 1293)

=== Rhwng Gwy a Hafren ===
The region of Rhwng Gwy a Hafren (Radnorshire), between the Rivers Wye and Severn, ruled by Lords. Associated with Brycheiniog and Buellt, they ruled the cantrefs of Maelienydd and Elfael.

- Elystan Glodrydd (c. 975, Æthelstan)
- Cadwgan ab Elstan Glodrydd
- Idnerth
- Madog (d. 1140)
- Cadwallon ap Madog (d. 1179), ruled Maelienydd and Elfael
- Einion Clud (d. 1177) ruled Maelienydd and Elfael
- Maelgwn (d. 1197)
- Cadwallon (d. 1234)

=== Lords of Senghenydd ===
The Lordship of Senghenydd was then a vassal of the Lordship of Glamorgan.

- Ifor Bach (c. 1158, Ifor ap Meurig), Lord of Senghenydd
- Gruffudd, Lord of Senghenydd (d. 1211)
- Rhys (d. 1256), Lord of Senghendd
- Gruffudd ap Rhys
- Llywelyn Bren (d. 1317)

=== Lords of Tegeingl ===
Lordship of Coleshill, Prestatyn, and Rhuddlan, also considered Princes.

- Edwin of Tegeingl (d. 1073, member of the Fifteen Tribes of Wales)
  - Owain ab Edwin of Tegeingl (d. 1105), father-in-law to Gruffudd ap Cynan

== Principality of Wales (1216–1542) ==
The late medieval territory of the Principality of Wales and the members of Welsh royalty who ruled that area or attempted to regain their dynastic inheritances during the Principality. They were titled (official) or claimants (unofficial/pretender) as the Prince of Wales. The territory of the principality included the kingdoms of Gwynedd, Deheubarth, and Powys, and also the areas of Ceredigion (Cardigan) and Carmarthenshire. There was the exception of Llywelyn ab Iorwerth, who ruled most of the territory of the Principality and also Montgomeryshire, but not as a Prince of Wales; by 1230 he styled himself as the Prince of Aberffraw and Lord of Snowdon (Prince of Gwynedd).

Coats of arms of native princes of Wales

Dafydd ap Gruffudd

Personal arms of Llywelyn ap Gruffudd (Llywelyn II)

Owain Gwynedd

Owain Lawgoch, Glyndwr

Llywelyn II, Dafydd II

=== Pre-Principality, 1165–1197 ===
- Owain Gwynedd (c. 1165–1170, Welsh: Owain Fawr), King of Gwynedd, Prince of Wales;
- Rhys ap Gruffydd (c. 1170–1197, The Lord Rhys), Lord of Deheubarth (Prince of South Wales), Prince of Wales.

=== Welsh rule, 1216–1283 ===
- Llywelyn Fawr ap Iorwerth (c. 1216–1240, English: Llywelyn I, the Great), Prince of Gwynedd, Prince of North Wales;
- Dafydd ap Llywelyn (c. 1240–1246, Dafydd II, English: David), Prince of Gwynedd (claimant Prince of Wales);
- Llywelyn ap Gruffudd (c. 1246–1282, English: Llywelyn II, the Last), Prince of Wales (Gwynedd, Aberffraw);
- Dafydd ap Gruffydd (c. 1282–1283, Dafydd III), Prince of Gwynedd (claimant Prince of Wales).

=== English rule, 1283–1542 ===
- Madog ap Llywelyn (c. 1294–1295), claimant Prince of Wales (heir of Lord Meirionnydd, House of Aberffraw);
- Owain ap Tomas ap Rhodri (c. 1372–1378, Lawgoch, English: Owen the Red Hand) in exile but claimed Prince of Wales (Gwynedd, Aberffraw);
- Owain ap Gruffudd (c. 1400–1415, Owain Glyndŵr, English: Owen Glendower), the last true Prince of Wales, Lord of Glyndyfrdwy (Powys Fadog).
- Rhys ap Gruffudd (c. 1529–1531, Rhys Fitz-Urien), Prince of Wales claimant (House of Dinefwr).

== See also ==
- Family tree of Welsh monarchs
- Kings of the Britons
- Fifteen Tribes of Wales
- List of Marcher lordships
- Prince of Wales
- List of British monarchs
- Welsh peers and baronets
- List of prime ministers of the United Kingdom
- List of first ministers of Wales

== Bibliography ==
- Bartrum, Peter Clement (1993). A Welsh Classical Dictionary: People in History and Legend Up to about A.D. 1000. National Library of Wales. ISBN 0907158730.
- biography.wales (Dictionary of Welsh Biography)
- Davies, John (1994). A History of Wales. Penguin Books. ISBN 9780140145816.
- Encyclopaedia of Wales. University of Wales Press. 2008. ISBN 978-0-7083-1953-6.
- Lloyd, John Edward (1912). A History of Wales from the Earliest Times to the Edwardian Conquest. Longmans, Green, and Co.
- Turvey, Roger (2010). Twenty-One Welsh Princes. Conwy: Gwasg Carreg Gwalch. ISBN 9781845272692.
