= Gwriad =

Gwriad (Latin: Guriat) is a Welsh name that may refer to:

- Guret of Alt Clut (died 658), ruler of Alt Clut, the Brythonic kingdom later known as Strathclyde
- Gwriad, the father of Edwyn ap Gwriad
- Gwriad ap Elidyr, 8th-century Brythonic chieftain
- Gwriad ap Merfyn, 9th-century prince of Gwynedd, Wales
