= Meurig ap Hywel =

Meurig ap Hywel (died c. 843/49) was a 9th-century king of Gwent in southeastern Wales.

The Chronicle of the Princes reported that in the year 843 AD, "Saxons" invaded Anglesey. Meurig, son of King Hywel of "Morgannwg" (actually, only part of Glywysing), was said to have joined Rhodri the Great in defeating them but to have fallen in the battle. The murder of "Mouric" or "Meuruc" by the Saxons is also recorded around this time by the Annals of Wales, although Phillimore's reconstruction of the dating places those entries in the year 849 instead. in the Annals of Wales.
