= Hyfaidd ap Bleddri =

King of Dyfed (c. 830–c. 892)

Hyfaidd ap Bleddri (Hyfaidd son of Bleddri) (c. 830 – c. 892) was a king of Dyfed.

The Triad 68 - "Three Kings who Sprang from Villeins" - in the Red Book of Hergest (which dates from the fourteenth century), lists Hyfaidd among their number, meaning that his father Bleddri or Bledrig was considered to have been a serf rather than a member of Dyfed's old royal family claiming descent from Aed Brosc. Hyfaidd's mother was supposed to be Tangwystl, a daughter of the earlier King Owain ap Maredudd.

T. Charles-Edwards argues that Hyfaidd was responsible for consolidating the lands that would later become Deheubarth, annexing Ystrad Tywi and possibly Ceredigion into Dyfed before his death in around 892. Hyfaidd was said to have oppressed the clerics of Meneva (modern St. David's) and exiled Bishop Nobis, earning him the enmity of Nobis's kinsman, the historian Asser, Bishop of Sherborne.

Although later Welsh histories made Hywel Dda's inheritance of Dyfed a peaceful affair brought about by his marriage to Hyfaidd's granddaughter Elen (d. 929) and the extinction of Hyfaidd's male line, Asser's more contemporary Life of King Alfred reports that Dyfed or Brycheiniog both fell under sustained attack from Hywel's uncle Anarawd and father Cadell. The expansionist policies of the sons of Rhodri Mawr meant that Kings Hyfaidd and Elise ap Tewdur of Brycheiniog both submitted to King Alfred of Wessex's overlordship in exchange for his protection.

Hyfaidd's sons Llywarch and Rhodri reigned after him, but were both dead by 905, both likely due to warfare. Rhodri ap Hyfaidd was killed by beheading in Arwystli. The kingdom of Dyfed was soon lost to Cadell's son Hywel who consolidated his realms as Deheubarth.

== Children ==
- Llywarch
- Rhodri
