= 848 =

Calendar year

848 in various calendars
Gregorian calendar	848; DCCCXLVIII
Ab urbe condita	1601
Armenian calendar	297; ԹՎ ՄՂԷ
Assyrian calendar	5598
Balinese saka calendar	769–770
Bengali calendar	254–255
Berber calendar	1798
Buddhist calendar	1392
Burmese calendar	210
Byzantine calendar	6356–6357
Chinese calendar	丁卯年 (Fire Rabbit); 3545 or 3338 — to — 戊辰年 (Earth Dragon); 3546 or 3339
Coptic calendar	564–565
Discordian calendar	2014
Ethiopian calendar	840–841
Hebrew calendar	4608–4609
- Hindu calendars
Vikram Samvat	904–905
Shaka Samvat	769–770
Kali Yuga	3948–3949
Holocene calendar	10848
Iranian calendar	226–227
Islamic calendar	233–234
Japanese calendar	Jōwa 15 / Kashō 1 (嘉祥元年)
Javanese calendar	745–746
Julian calendar	848; DCCCXLVIII
Korean calendar	3181
Minguo calendar	1064 before ROC 民前1064年
Nanakshahi calendar	−620
Seleucid era	1159/1160 AG
Thai solar calendar	1390–1391
Tibetan calendar	མེ་མོ་ཡོས་ལོ་ (female Fire-Hare); 974 or 593 or −179 — to — ས་ཕོ་འབྲུག་ལོ་ (male Earth-Dragon); 975 or 594 or −178

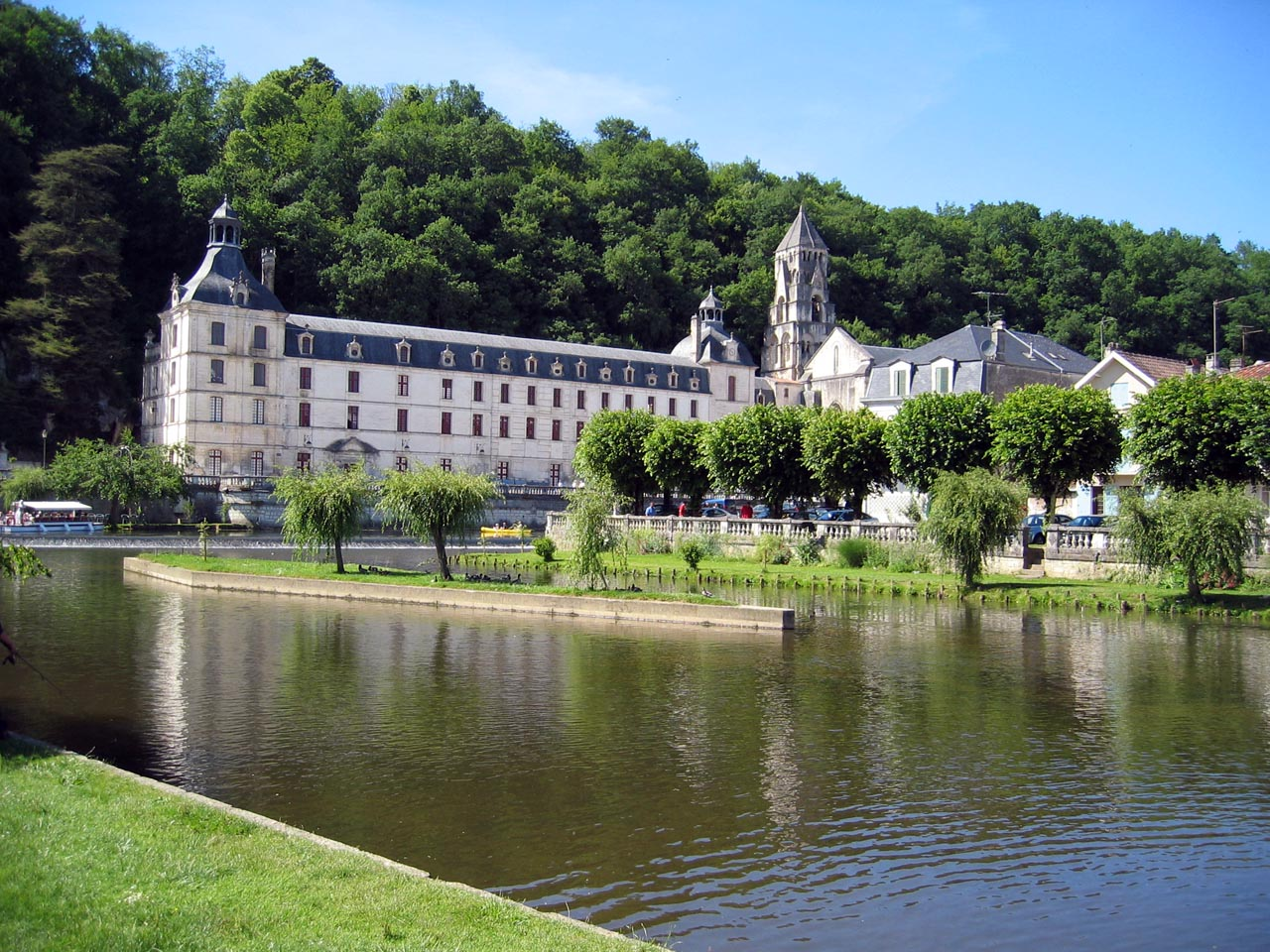
The Abbey of Saint-Pierre (France)

Year 848 (DCCCXLVIII) was a leap year starting on Sunday of the Julian calendar.

== Events ==
=== By place ===
==== Europe ====
- Summer – Bordeaux, capital of Aquitaine, falls into the hands of Viking raiders. King Charles the Bald sends a Frankish fleet to lift the siege. Despite destroying some Viking longships on the Dordogne River, they fail to save the city. The Abbey of Saint-Pierre in Brantôme is sacked.
- Emperor Lothair I, and his (half) brothers Louis the German and Charles the Bald, meet in Koblenz to continue the system of "con-fraternal government".
- Frankish forces under Count (comté) William of Septimania assume authority over the counties of Barcelona and Empúries (modern Spain).
- The Saracens conquer Ragusa (Sicily), after its Byzantine garrison is forced by severe famine to surrender. The city and its castle are razed to the ground.
- Máel Sechnaill mac Maíl Ruanaid, High King of Mide, defeats a Norse Viking army at Sciath Nechtain in Ireland (approximate date).

==== Britain ====
- The armies of Brycheiniog and Gwent clash in the battle of Ffinnant (Wales). King Ithel of Gwent is killed in the fighting (approximate date).

==== Asia ====
- The Medieval Cholas in Southern India start to rule (approximate date).

=== By topic ===
==== Religion ====
- Pope Leo IV builds (on the opposite of the Tiber River) the Leonine City, a fortified three-kilometre wall that encircles the Vatican Hill and Borgo, to defend Rome.
- The Roman Catholic church of Santa María del Naranco, on the slope of Monte Naranco (Northern Spain), is completed.

== Births ==
- Alfonso III, king of Asturias (approximate date)
- Carloman, Frankish abbot (d. 877)
- Charles the Child, king of Aquitaine (or 847)
- Lothair the Lame, Frankish abbot (d. 865)
- Onneca Fortúnez, Basque princess (or 850)

== Deaths ==
- Cui Yuanshi, chancellor of the Tang dynasty
- Drest X, king of the Picts
- Guo, empress dowager of the Tang dynasty
- Ithel, king of Gwent (approximate date)
- Li Gongzuo, Chinese writer
- Malik ibn Kaydar, Muslim governor
- Rechtabhra, bishop of Clonfert
- Shi Xiong, Chinese general
- Sunifred, Frankish nobleman
- Sunyer I, Frankish nobleman
- William I, duke of Gascony
- Yahya al-Laithi, Muslim scholar
