= Anarawd ap Rhodri =

King of Gwynedd from 878 to 916

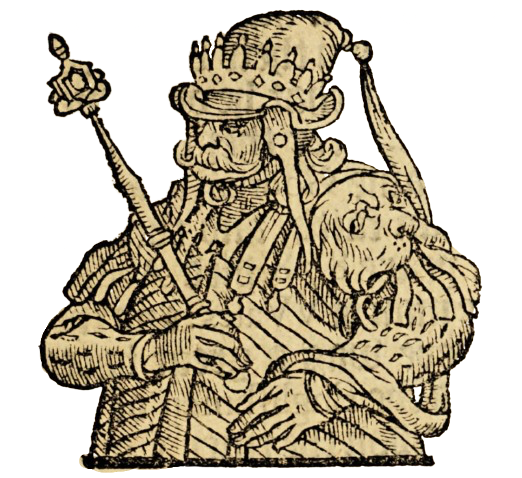
- A fanciful illustration of Anarawd ap Rhodri from the Historie of Cambria (1584)

King of Gwynedd
- Reign: 878–916
- Predecessor: Rhodri Mawr
- Successor: Idwal Foel
- Died: 916; Anglesey
- Issue: Idwal Foel
- Dynasty: Second Dynasty of Gwynedd
- Father: Rhodri Mawr
- Mother: Angharad ferch Meurig

Anarawd ap Rhodri (d. 916) was King of Gwynedd from 878 to 916. He faced challenges from the kingdom of Mercia and Viking raiders during a period of uncertainty for his realm. Nonetheless, he managed to secure his dynasty's future through his actions and leadership in this tumultuous era.

== Early life ==
Anarawd was born in the 9th century in the Kingdom of Gwynedd, which was ruled by his father, King Rhodri Mawr. His mother was Angharad ferch Meurig of Ceredigion, sister of Gwgon ap Meurig who held the throne of Seisyllwg. Anarawd is considered to have been the eldest of the children, with brothers Cadell and Merfyn, although Rhodri is recorded in having six sons in some sources.

Rhodri's reign was marked by successful territorial expansions and the defense against numerous Viking invasions. However, Rhodri met his demise in a battle against Ceolwulf II of Mercia. Following his father's death, Anarawd ascended to the throne, inheriting a vast kingdom that stretched from the Isle of Anglesey to the Wye River.

== Reign ==
=== Battle of the Conwy ===
One of Anarawd's earliest and most significant achievements was his decisive victory at the Battle of the Conwy in 881. In this battle, he defeated Æthelred, Lord of the Mercians, in Cymryd, near the mouth of the Conwy River. This triumph was celebrated and revered in Welsh history, with the Welsh annals even dubbing it as "God's Vengeance for Rhodri". The Battle of Conwy proved to be a catastrophic defeat for Æthelred, as it shattered any aspirations he had of extending Mercian authority over Wales. In the wake of this defeat, his position became increasingly unsustainable, ultimately leading him to submit to the overlordship of Alfred the Great, the King of Wessex. This marked a significant turning point not only in the rule of Æthelred, reign but also in the broader political dynamics of the time, as it effectively ended Mercian ambitions in Wales and solidified Alfred's influence in the region. Contrastingly, the Battle of the Conwy marked a resounding success for Anarawd, as it brought stability to his borders and opened up new opportunities for expansion. In the aftermath of the battle, Anarawd seized the chance to raid and exert his influence over the small kingdoms in the south that were no longer under Mercian overlordship. These raids had a significant impact, prompting Hyfaidd ap Bleddri and Tewdr ap Elisedd of Dyfed and Brycheiniog to seek the overlordship of Alfred, who had begun to show interest in the Welsh kingdoms.

=== Alliances with Scandinavian York and Wessex ===
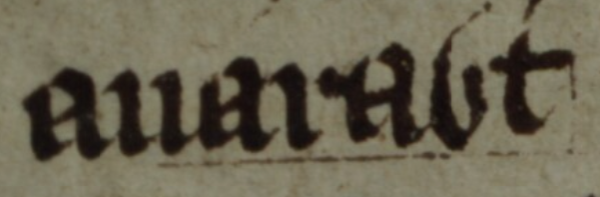
Anarawd's name as it appears on folio 58v of Oxford Jesus College MS 11

After the Battle of the Conwy, Anarawd took a strategic step to safeguard his kingdom and mitigate the threat of future Mercian advances. He forged an alliance with the Viking Scandinavian York. This alliance served a dual purpose: first, it provided additional protection against potential Mercian incursions, and second, it aimed to curb the frequent Viking raids that had plagued Wales since the early years of the century. The alliance with the Scandinavian York seemed to have brought a period of relative calm between 880 and 890, with no recorded Viking activity in Anarawd's realm during this time. However, in 892, Anarawd faced a significant threat when a Viking host from Chester launched an attack on his kingdom. Anarawd's forces successfully repelled the raiders, who then redirected their incursion southward. This attack, coupled with the increasing Viking pressure in the Irish Sea region, prompted Anarawd to reassess his strategic alliances. In the year 893, Anarawd and his brothers chose to abandon their alliance with the Scandinavian York and embarked on a journey to Alfred's court. There, they pledged their fealty to Alfred, becoming subject kings under his rule, much like Æthelred had done previously. As a result of this alliance, Anarawd received a range of valuable gifts from Alfred and, more importantly, the protection of Alfred's forces against external threats. It is highly likely that Anarawd also formed an alliance with his former rival, Æthelred, around this time. Both Anarawd and Æthelred, as powerful subjects of Alfred, shared common interests and ambitions that were hindered by West Saxon overlordship.

=== Conquest of Dyfed ===
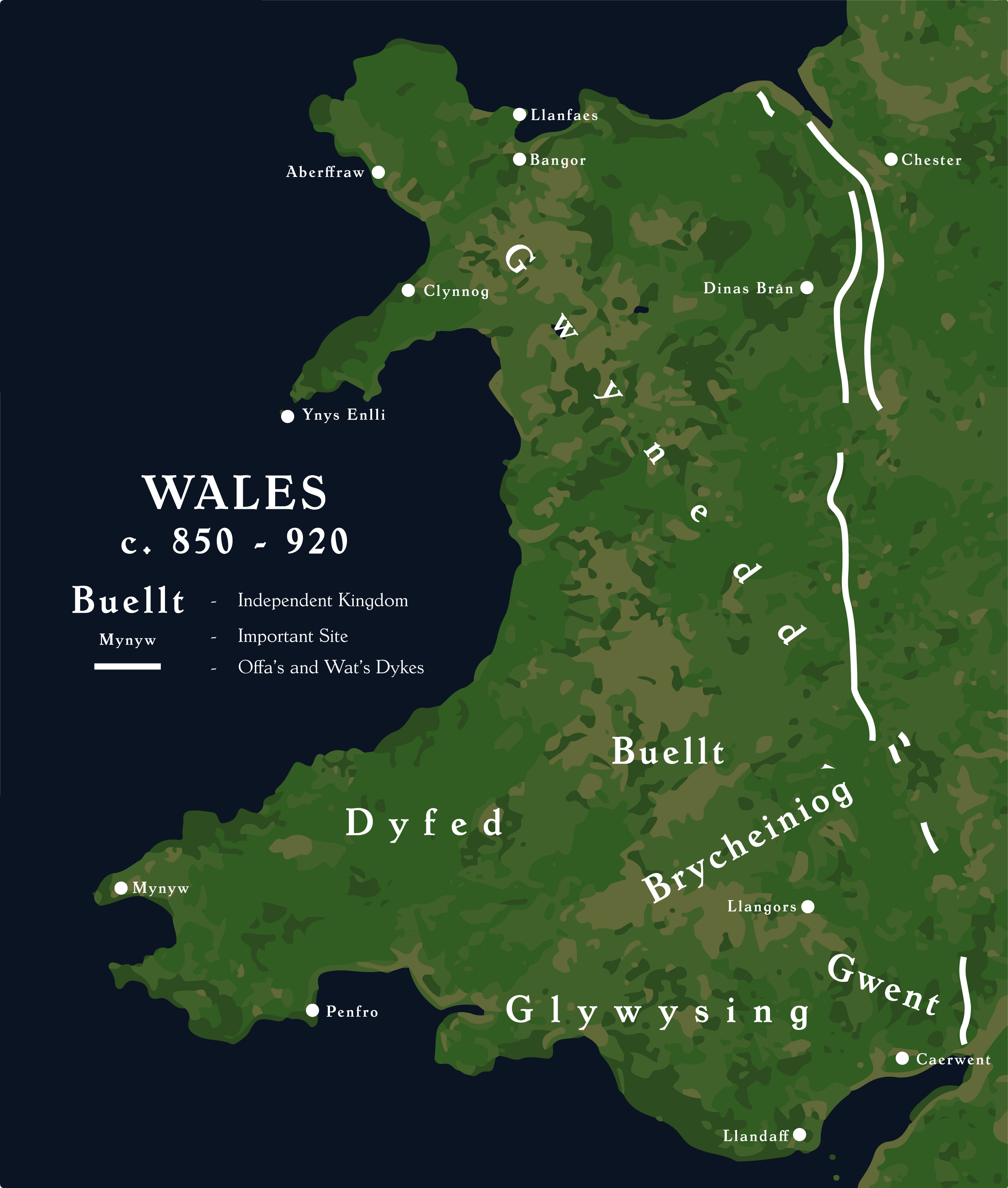
Wales c. 850 – 920

In the year following these events, an opportunity presented itself when the King of Dyfed, Hyfaidd ap Bleddri, passed away. Anarawd wasted no time and seized this chance for expansion. In 894, he launched merciless raids into Ceredigion and the Tywi Valley, and to bolster his efforts, he enlisted the assistance of Mercian troops. Hyfaidd's son, Llywarch ap Hyfaidd, succeeded his father as the ruler of Dyfed, but his reign was marked by escalating pressure from Gwynedd under Anarawd's leadership. The circumstances surrounding Llywarch's death in 903 remain unclear. Following Llywarch's death, his brother Rhodri ap Hyfaidd assumed the rule of King of Dyfed. However, his reign was short-lived, lasting only a year as he was beheaded in Arwystli after suffering a defeat in battle against the Merfynion. This event marked the culmination of Anarawd's conquest of Kingdom of Dyfed. Dyfed appears to have been ruled as a distinct kingdom from Gwynedd under the leadership of Anarawd's brother, Cadell ap Rhodri. The precise circumstances and events that led to Cadell's acquisition of the Kingdom of Dyfed remain shrouded in ambiguity.

=== Conflict with Ingimundr ===
In the year 902, an alliance of Irish Kings dealt a significant blow to the Vikings of Dublin, causing many of them to disperse. Some of these exiled Viking warriors formed roving bands, seeking opportunities for plunder and settlement in foreign lands. Among these bands was one led by the warrior Ingimundr, which chose to settle on the eastern coast of Anglesey in the region of Llanfaes. Anarawd, however, was not one to tolerate Viking incursions. He confronted Ingimundr and his band in a battle on Anglesey, emerging victorious. Following this defeat, Ingimundr was forced to flee to Chester.

=== Death ===
Anarawd died in 916. He was commemorated in the Annales Cambriae as the "King of the Britons".

== Succession ==
Following his death, his son Idwal ascended to the throne, succeeding him as the King of Gwynedd.

== See also ==
- Family tree of Welsh monarchs

== Sources ==
- Powel, David (1584). The historie of Cambria, now called Wales: a part of the most famous Yland of Brytaine, written in the Brytish language aboue two hundreth yeares past. Translated by Llwyd, Humphrey. London: Rafe Newberrie and Henrie Denham. IA historieofcambri00cara.

Anarawd ap Rhodri The Merfynion Died: 916
Regnal titles
Preceded by Rhodri Mawr	King of the Britons; 878–916	Succeeded by Idwal Foel
Preceded by Rhodri Mawr	King of Gwynedd; 878–916	Succeeded by Idwal Foel
Preceded by Rhodri Mawr	King of Powys; 878–916	Succeeded by Idwal Foel
