= Seisyll ap Clydog =

7th or 8th century King of Ceredigion, Wales

Seisyll ap Clydog was King of Ceredigion in Wales some time in the late 7th or early 8th century. He gave his name to the later kingdom of Seisyllwg, which consisted of Ceredigion plus the region known as Ystrad Tywi; as such he was possibly the king responsible for the expansion. However, there is no contemporary evidence of this, and almost nothing is known of his life or reign.

== History ==
Seisyll appears in the Harleian genealogies for the kings of Ceredigion. Here, he is named as the son of Clydog or Clitauc Artgloys, and is the sixth in descent from Ceredig, the traditional founder of Ceredigion. The Harleian also names him as the father of Arthgen, presumably the King of Ceredigion whom the Annales Cambriae record as dying in 807. Seisyll's name appears to derive from the notional Late Latin *Saxillus, which comes from the same root as the Welsh sais, meaning Saxon or Englishman.

Seisyll ap Clydog is generally taken to be the Seisyll for whom Seisyllwg was named. As such, historians such as John Edward Lloyd and Egerton Phillimore believed that he was the king who founded that kingdom. However, contemporary sources continue to use the name Ceredigion for the realm of Seisyll and his successors. As such, "Seisyllwg" may represent a substantially later political development.
