= Seisyllwg =

Early medieval Welsh kingdom

Coordinates: 53°14′N 4°1′W

Kingdom of Seisyllwg Teyrnas Seisyllwg (Old Welsh)
- 680–920
- Wales in 10th century
- Common languages: Welsh
- Government: Monarchy
- Historical era: Middle Ages
  - Changed name from Ceredigion: 680
  - Union with Dyfed forming Deheubarth: 920
Preceded by	Succeeded by
Kingdom of Ceredigion	Deheubarth

Seisyllwg (Welsh: [sɛiˈsəɬʊɡ]) was a petty kingdom of medieval Wales. It is unclear when it emerged as a distinct unit, but according to later sources it consisted of the former Kingdom of Ceredigion plus the region known as Ystrad Tywi. Thus it covered the modern county of Ceredigion, part of Carmarthenshire, and the Gower Peninsula. It is evidently named after Seisyll, king of Ceredigion in the 7th or early 8th century, but it is unknown if he was directly responsible for its establishment. In the 10th century Seisyllwg became the centre of power for Hywel Dda, who came to rule most of Wales. In 920 Hywel merged Seisyllwg with the Kingdom of Dyfed to form the new kingdom of Deheubarth.

== Origins ==
It is unclear when Seisyllwg emerged as a distinct unit. It is assumed to have been named for Seisyll ap Clydog, King of Ceredigion in the 7th or early 8th century, and as such he is traditionally regarded as its founder. Seisyll appears in the Harleian genealogies for the Kings of Ceredigion, but no early sources attribute the foundation of Seisyllwg to him, and the name Ceredigion continues to be used into the 9th century. The name Seisyllwg appears in some later sources, such as the Book of Llandaff, the Welsh Triads, and the Welsh laws, the latter of which describes it as one of the three principal subdivisions of South Wales, along with Morgannwg and Reinwg (probably Dyfed). However, the first clear description of the territory is in the First Branch of the Mabinogi, where Seisyllwg is said to include the four cantrefs of Ceredigion plus the three of Ystrad Tywi, a description which accords with that in the laws.

== Later history and merger with Dyfed ==
In 872, Gwgon, the last in the traditional line of kings of Ceredigion, drowned, leaving no heir. Gwgon's sister, Angharad, was married to Rhodri Mawr (Rhodri the Great) of Gwynedd, who became steward over Gwgon's realm. While this gave Rhodri no standing to claim kingship himself, he was able to install his and Angharad's younger son, Cadell, as the new King of Seisyllwg. Cadell ruled as a vassal to his father, and later, to his elder brother Anarawd, who established the House of Dinefwr.

After Cadell's death in 911, Seisyllwg was divided among his two sons, Hywel (later known as Hywel Dda, or Howel the Good), and Clydog. Hywel probably already had control over the neighbouring kingdom of Dyfed by that time; there are no known kings of Dyfed following the death of Llywarch ap Hyfaidd in 904, and Hywel is known to have been married to Llywarch's daughter, Elen. He certainly had control over it by the time Clydog died in 920, leaving Seisyllwg to Hywel. Hywel quickly merged Seisyllwg and Dyfed into the new kingdom of Deheubarth, which covered most of southwest Wales. From this power base, he later went on to unite almost all of Wales.
