= Gwriad ap Merfyn =

Gwriad ap Merfyn or ap Rhodri was a 9th-century prince of Gwynedd in northern Wales. He is an obscure figure, sometimes being listed as Rhodri the Great's brother and sometimes as his son.

The Chronicle of the Princes' entry for AD 873 reads:

The action on Sunday in Mona, in which Rhodri and his brother Gwriad and Gweirydd son of Owain of Glamorgan were killed by the Saxons; and then the women of Anglesey took arms and rushed upon the Saxons and slaughtered them grievously until they were obliged to flee.

Similarly, the 877 entry for The Kings of the English reads "Rhodri and Gwriad his brother..."

Other sources, however, record a Gwriad ap Rhodri as the progenitor of the "men of Nant Mawr in Twrcelyn" on Anglesey or list him among the children of Rhodri Mawr. As the lesser figures of these lists of children vary both in name and number from source to source, it is possible this Gwriad was simply created to link other genealogies to Rhodri.
