= Battle of the Conwy =

881 Welsh-English battle

Coordinates: 53.28°N 3.83°W

Date	881
Location	River Conwy
Result	Welsh victory

Belligerents
Gwynedd	Mercia

Commanders and leaders
Anarawd	Æthelred

Strength
Unknown	Unknown

Casualties and losses
Unknown	Unknown

The Battle of the Conwy took place in 881 between King Anarawd and his brothers of the northern Welsh Kingdom of Gwynedd and a Mercian army almost certainly led by Æthelred, Lord of the Mercians. The Welsh were victorious, and the battle ended the traditional hegemony of Mercia over north Wales and contributed to Æthelred's decision to accept the lordship of King Alfred the Great of Wessex. This united under Alfred the Anglo-Saxons who were not subject to Viking rule, and was a step towards the creation of the Kingdom of England. Anarawd allied himself with the Vikings shortly after the battle, but he then abandoned this alliance to follow Æthelred in accepting Alfred's lordship.

== Background ==
The Welsh kingdoms had been subject to Mercia since the mid seventh-century, and in 853 the Mercians received the assistance of the West Saxons to maintain their hegemony. In the 870s Mercia became subject to attacks by the Viking Great Heathen Army, and in 874 it drove out King Burgred. He was succeeded by the last independent King of Mercia, Ceolwulf II, who was presented by the Anglo-Saxon Chronicle as a puppet of the Vikings. In 877 they partitioned Mercia, taking the east for themselves and leaving the west to Ceolwulf. Gwynedd was also under attack from the Vikings, and in 877 King Rhodri Mawr was defeated and driven out. He returned the following year, but immediately came under attack from Mercia, which was still trying to maintain its hegemony in Wales. King Alfred's victory over the Vikings at the Battle of Edington in May 878 relieved the pressure on Mercia, and in the same year Mercia defeated and killed Rhodri Mawr. Ceolwulf died or was deposed in 879, and was succeeded as Lord of the Mercians by Æthelred.

== The battle ==
In 881 the Mercians invaded Gwynedd, and they met Anarawd and his brothers, sons of Rhodri, at the Battle of the Conwy. The result was a Mercian defeat, described by Welsh annals as "revenge by God for Rhodri". In the view of Thomas Charles-Edwards, this represents the Welsh view of the conflict between the two kingdoms as a blood feud. According to a thirteenth-century collection of Welsh genealogies, the Mercian leader was called "Edryd Long-Hair", almost certainly Æthelred. This is supported by The History of Wales, published in 1697, described by Simon Keynes as "of quite uncertain authority":

The Britons having returned their thanks to Anarawd, presently fell to work, and Necessity giving edge to their Valour, they easily dispossessed the Saxons who were not as yet warm in their Seats. For some time they continued peaceably in this part of Wales; but Eadred Duke of Mercia, called by the Welch Edryd Wallthir, not being able to bear any longer such an ignominious ejection, made great Preparations for the re-gaining of the said Country. But the Northern Britons, who had settled themselves there, having intelligence of his Design, for the better security of their Cattel and other Effects, moved them beyond the River Conwey. Prince Anarawd in the meantime was not idle, but drawing together all the Strength he could raise, encamped his army near the Town of Conwey at a place called Cymryt, where he and his Men having made gallant Resistance against the pressing Efforts of the Saxons, obtained a very compleat Victory. This Battel was by some called Gwaeth Cymryt Conwey, by reason that it was fought in the Township of Cymryt near Conwey. But Prince Anarawd would have it called Dial Rodri, because he had there revenged the Death of his Father Rodri. (Note: The History of Wales published in 1697, was described as a work in Welsh by the twelfth-century Welsh writer Carradoc Of Lhancarvan, translated by the sixteenth-century Welsh historian David Powel, and augmented and improved by W. Wynne.)

== Aftermath ==
After the Battle of the Conwy, Mercia was forced to abandon its claim to lordship over north Wales, although Æthelred continued to attempt to exercise power over the south-eastern Welsh kingdoms of Glywysing and Gwent. These kingdoms sought the lordship of Alfred the Great, according to his biographer, Asser, "driven by the military power and tyranny of Ealdorman Æthelred and the Mercians". Æthelred followed in accepting West Saxon lordship by 883. In the view of Thomas Charles Edwards:

The implication of all this is that the Mercian submission to Alfred – a crucial step in the creation of a single English kingdom – occurred not just because of one battle, Alfred's victory over the Great Army at Edington in 878, but also because of another, more distant battle, 'God's revenge' on the Mercians at the Conwy, when Anarawd of Gwynedd and his brothers defeated Æthelred and so brought about that collapse of the Mercian hegemony in Wales from which Alfred was only too pleased to benefit.

Gwynedd formed an alliance with the Vikings of Northumbria soon after the battle, and according to Asser the south-west Welsh kingdom of Dyfed and the central southern kingdom of Brycheiniog sought Alfred's lordship due to the tyranny of Gwynedd. Asser also stated that Anarawd abandoned his Viking alliance because it brought him no benefit and submitted to Alfred. In Charles-Edwards' view, this may have been because Viking raids on Gwynedd continued. Welsh annals record an attack by the 'Dark Northmen' on Gwynedd in 892.

== Sources ==
- Carradoc Of Lhancarvan (1697). The History of Wales. Translated by David Powel and. Augmented by W. Wynne.
- Charles-Edwards, Thomas (2013). Wales and the Britons 350–1064. Oxford University Press. ISBN 978-0-19-821731-2.
- Keynes, Simon (1998). "King Alfred and the Mercians". In Blackburn, M. A. S.; Dumville, D. N. (eds.). Kings, Currency and Alliances: History and Coinage of Southern England in the Ninth Century. ISBN 0-85115-598-7.
- Williams, Ann (1991). "Ceolwulf II, king of Mercia 874–879". In Ann Williams; Alfred P. Smyth; D. P. Kirby (eds.). A Biographical Dictionary of Dark Age Britain. Seaby.
