= Gwgon ap Meurig =

9th-century King of Ceredigion

Gwgon ap Meurig (died c. 870/871) was a 9th-century king of Ceredigion and Ystrad Tywi (i.e., Seisyllwg) in southwest Wales.

Gwgon was the son of the former king Meurig ap Dyfnwallon and inherited the realm on the death of his father.

Gwgon's sister Angharad married King Rhodri the Great of Gwynedd. Gwgon is recorded by the annals as drowning around 871. The Chronicle of the Princes places his death in the entry for 870 and says he drowned crossing the River Llychwr in Gower while fighting Viking invaders.

Contrary to Welsh law, rule was then reported to have passed to Angharad's son Cadell as a subordinate king to his father.
