= Ystrad Tywi =

Region of South Wales

Coordinates: 51.868°N 4.255°W

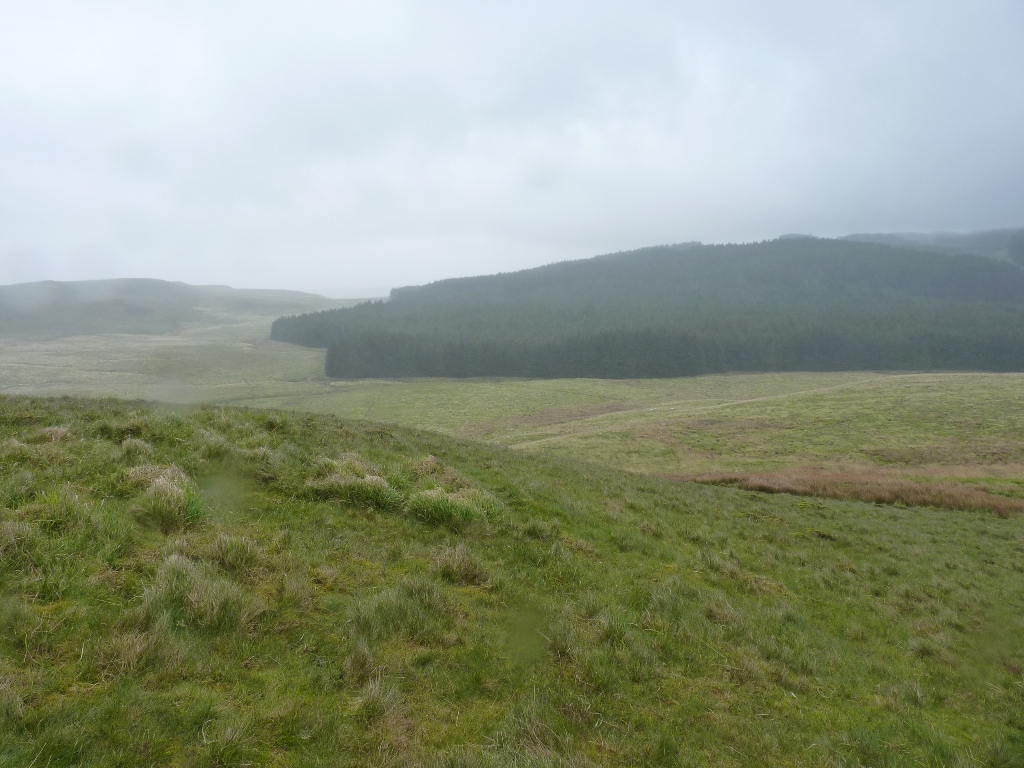
Hillside and bog above the source of the Tywi

Ystrad Tywi (Welsh: [ˈəstrad ˈtəwi], Valley of the river Towy) is a region of southwest Wales situated on both banks of the River Towy (Welsh: Afon Tywi), it contained places such as Cedweli, Carnwyllion, Loughor, Llandeilo, and Gwyr (although this is disputed). Although Ystrad Tywi was never a kingdom itself, it was historically a valuable territory and was fought over by the various kings of Dyfed, Deheubarth, Seisyllwg, Gwynedd, Morgannwg and the Normans.

== History ==
At the start of the 8th century Ystrad Tywi was part of the kingdom of Dyfed. Around the year 730 Seisyll ap Clydog, king of Ceredigion, captured Ystrad Tywi from Rhain ap Cadwgan, king of Dyfed, and annexed it to his own kingdom. The name Seisyllwg was given to the new enlarged kingdom. As a result, Brycheiniog was once again detached from Dyfed; Ystrad Tywi had previously joined the two.

In an attempt to regain the lands previously held by his father Rhodri Mawr, in 894 king Anarawd ap Rhodri of Gwynedd—together with a Wessex force from his ally Alfred the Great—raided both Ystrad Tywi and Ceredigion.

In 920 Hywel Dda united Seisyllwg and Dyfed to create the kingdom of the Deheubarth.

In medieval times Ystrad Tywi was divided into three cantrefi. Cantref Mawr on the north bank; Cantref Bychan and Cantref Eginawc on the south bank of the river. Eginawc (comprising the commotes Gŵyr, Carnwyllion and Kidwelly) which was fought over many times between the Welsh and the Normans in the 11th century, and for the rest of the Middle Ages only the other two cantrefi formed Ystrad Tywi.

Ystrad Tywi was transformed into the county of Carmarthen when King Edward I enacted the Statute of Rhuddlan in 1284 following the success of his war against Llywelyn ap Gruffudd, Prince of Wales. Though Gŵyr had by now become part of Glamorgan, the rest of Eginawc was later restored to Ystrad Tywi, which was joined with Gwarthaf (except Efelfre) to form the modern county of Carmarthenshire.

== In legend ==
In the first branch of the Four Branches of the Mabinogi, the tale Pwyll Pendefig Dyfed is told of the son of Pwyll, Pryderi, following his father on the throne of Dyfed and adding the three cantrefi of Ystrad Tywi and the four cantrefi of Ceredigion to his kingdom.
