= Rhodri Mawr =

King of Gwynedd and Man from 844 to 878

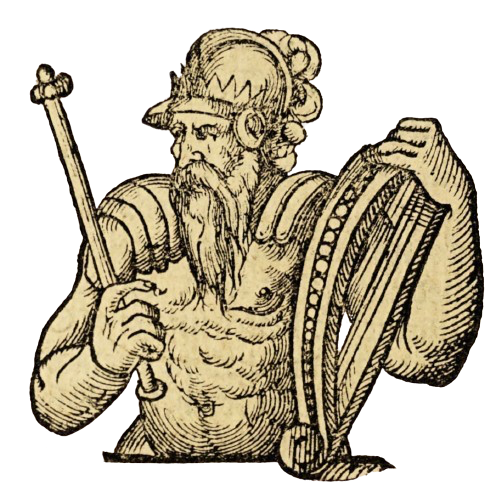
- A fanciful illustration of Rhodri Mawr from the Historie of Cambria (1584)

King of Gwynedd
- Reign: 844-878
- Predecessor: Merfyn Frych
- Successor: Anarawd ap Rhodri

King of the Isle of Man
- Reign: 844-878
- Predecessor: Merfyn Frych
- Successor: Anarawd ap Rhodri
- Died: 878
- Issue: Gwriad ap Rhodri; Anarawd ap Rhodri; Cadell ap Rhodri; Merfyn ap Rhodri; Tudwal Gloff; Meurig ap Rhodri; Gwyddelig ap Rhodri
- Dynasty: Merfynion
- Father: Merfyn Frych
- Mother: Nest ferch Cadell

Rhodri ap Merfyn or Rhodri Mawr ('Rhodri the Great', Welsh pronunciation: [ˈr̥ɔdri mau̯r], died 878) was king of Gwynedd and the Isle of Man from 844 until 878. Little is known of his reign, though he engaged in repeated conflicts with the Hiberno-Norse and was ultimately slain in battle by the forces of Ceolwulf II of Mercia in 878. After his death, his sons Anarawd and Cadell would expand the rule of the dynasty across Wales. Rhodri's own legacy is intimately associated with the collections of genealogies likely compiled during his reign, forming the oldest collection of such material in medieval Welsh literature.

== Life ==
Rhodri was the son of Merfyn Frych, king of Gwynedd and Nest, daughter of Cadell ap Brochfael of Powys. Likely with the aid of Norsemen, Rhodri's father set out from his native Isle of Man and launched a bid for the throne of Gwynedd in 826 as a representative of the line of Cynan Dindaethwy, as Cynan had only one child, Merfyn's mother Esyllt. Merfyn died in 844, and was succeeded by Rhodri. Rhodri appears to have continued his father's rule in both Gwynedd and the Isle of Man, as a contemporary poem recording his death in the margins of the main manuscript of the Annals of Ulster calls him Ruaidri Manann 'Ruaidrí of Man'. It does not appear that the Norse settled the Isle of Man until the year 900.

There are few events known from Rhodri's life. In 853, the combined forces of Burgred of Mercia and Æthelwulf of Wessex invaded Wales and acquired Welsh submission; Rhodri may have been among those to submit. In 856, he slew a certain Orm, a leader of the viking faction known as the Dubgenti in Irish sources. Thomas Charles-Edwards hypothesised that the Findgennti, a rival viking faction to the Dubgenti, were Rhodri's allies. Rhodri's victory in 856 may have been the victory over the Norse celebrated in a contemporary Latin poem by the Continental Irish scholar Sedulius Scottus, if Rhodri is to be identified with the king Roricus in an adjacent poem. Despite his interaction with such powers in the Irish Sea, it is difficult to assess Rhodri's contemporary power within Wales. Charles-Edwards denied that Rhodri ever expanded beyond the traditional borders of Gwynedd, but rather threatened the Mercian tributary of Powys. However, Ben Guy has argued that Rhodri exercised some kind of overlordship over Ceredigion. Gwgon, the king of Ceredigion, was drowned in 872. However, drowning was known to be a punishment meted upon kings, especially by an overlord to subordinate king. Guy notes that Gwgon's overlord at the time could have been either Rhodri or Hyfaidd of Dyfed, who was certainly overlord of Ceredigion after Rhodri's death, but the evidence of Gwgon's pedigree from Cunedda in the Harleian Genealogies and the Cunedda story in the near-contemporary Historia Brittonum would suggest that Gwgon was at the time seen as a peripheral offshoot of the royal line of Gwynedd, whose boundaries ideally stretched from the Dee to the Teifi.

The only other certain events of Rhodri's life are those leading up to his death. In 877 AD, the Dubgenti attacked Rhodri in the Gueith Diu Sul in Mon 'Sunday Battle in Anglesey' and forced him to take refuge in Ireland. Charles-Edwards notes that Mercia was partitioned by vikings in the same year, and so this attack may represent Norse leaders interloping in the traditional Mercian overlordship over Wales and securing communications with their base in Dublin by conquering Anglesey. Rhodri returned to Wales the following year, but was the object of a campaign by Ceolwulf of Mercia, who slew Rhodri together with his son Gwriad. Charles-Edwards notes that Ceolwulf may have had a relatively free hand in 878, as the Great Heathen Army was occupied with its final attack on Wessex, so after Rhodri returned to Gwynedd, Ceolwulf may have sought to reassert once more the Mercian overlordship over Wales, incidentally killing Rhodri in the process.

== Legacy ==
Three years after Rhodri's death, the Annales Cambriæ record a Gueit Conguoy, digal Rotri a Deo, or the 'Battle of the Conwy, revenge by God for Rhodri'. Later Welsh genealogical material notes that the sons of Rhodri fought this battle against a certain 'Edryd Long-Hair', in which Tudwal ap Rhodri was lamed. Thus, the sons of Rhodri exacted their revenge not on their father's killer Ceolwulf but his successor Æthelred of Mercia, and Charles-Edwards notes the annalist appears to see the relationship between the Mercians and the Venedotians as a blood-feud. This may be congruent with Asser's depiction of Æthelred's overlordship in Wales as one of military tyranny. After Mercian overlordship was broken and Æthelred forced to submit to Alfred of Wessex, Anarawd and Cadell overran all except the south-east of Wales in the following decades, with Anarawd retaining Gwynedd and Cadell establishing himself in Ceredigion and later Dyfed. Rhodri was given other sons in later genealogies, namely Meurig ap Rhodri, Merfyn ap Rhodri, and Gwyddelig ap Rhodri; the latter two sons and those of Tudwal were taken to be the ancestors of various free kindreds in Anglesey and Llŷn.

== Rhodri and the earliest Welsh genealogies ==
Rhodri's reign likely saw the codification of the earliest surviving collection of Welsh genealogies, namely those relating to the First Dynasty of Gwynedd. According to the pseudo-historical account in the Historia Brittonum, Cunedda Wledig came to Wales from a certain region called Manaw Gododdin and exterminated the recently-arrived Irish settlers in Wales and annexed 'many territories in the western part of Britain'. Each son of Cunedda was believed to be the eponymous founder of one of the territories surrounding Arfon and Anglesey, which were instead held by Einion Yrth, the ancestor of subsequent kings of Gwynedd. Thus, according to Ben Guy, '[t]he Cunedda story simultaneously justifies these separate units while also tying them together into a single, overarching political entity... [in a way that] work[s] to the advantage of the king of Gwynedd', and would have been particularly useful to Rhodri's aims in Ceredigion, as its king was supposed to have been a descendant of one of the sons of Cunedda. Guy notes further that the inclusion of genealogies reflecting this story in the Harleian genealogies implies that this section was compiled earlier than the reign of their commissioner Owain ap Hywel Dda, perhaps in 858 at Abergele in the reign of Rhodri Mawr. This 'Gwynedd Collection of Genealogies' would also have contained the earliest genealogical material associated with figures of the Old North which appear in the Historia Brittonum.

== Works cited ==
- Bartrum, P. C., ed. (1966). Early Welsh Genealogical Tracts. Cardiff: University of Wales Press. ISBN 9780708300497.
  ——, ed. (1974). Welsh Genealogies: AD 300-1400. Cardiff: University of Wales Press. doi:10.20391/40837b6f-1887-4afd-9c6e-9b7e3a122693. ISBN 070830561X. Archived from the original on 6 June 2023.
- Chadwick, Nora K. (1958). "Early Culture and Learning in North Wales". Studies in the Early British Church. Cambridge: Cambridge University Press. pp. 29–120. IA studiesinearlybr0000nora.
- Charles-Edwards, Thomas, ed. (2006). The Chronicle of Ireland. Liverpool: Liverpool University Press. ISBN 9780853239598.
  —— (2013). Wales and the Britons, 350-1064. Oxford: Oxford University Press. ISBN 9780198217312. IA walesbritons35010000char.
- Fraser, James E. (2009). From Caledonia to Pictland: Scotland to 795. Edinburgh: Edinburgh University Press. ISBN 9780748628209. IA from-caledonia-to-pictland-scotland-to-795-james-e.-fraser-z-library.
- Guy, Ben (2020). Medieval Welsh Genealogy: an Introduction and Textual Study. Woodbridge: Boydell Press. doi:10.1017/9781787448988. ISBN 9781783275137.
  —— (2023). "Manaw of the Britons: the Pre-Viking Kings of Man" (PDF). Isle of Man Studies. 18. Isle of Man Natural History and Antiquarian Society: 145–161. doi:10.5284/1050092. Archived from the original (PDF) on 8 August 2024.
- Meyers, Jean, ed. (1991). Sedulii Scotti carmina (in Latin). Brepols: Turnhout. ISBN 2503041728.
- Morris, John, ed. (1980). Nennius: British History and The Welsh Annals. London: Phillimore. ISBN 9780847662647.
- Ó Corráin, Donnchadh; Cournane, Mavis, eds. (2005). "The Annals of Ulster". CELT: The Corpus of Electronic Texts. Dublin: Dublin Institute for Advanced Studies. Archived from the original on 18 April 2026.
- Stevenson, William Henry, ed. (1959). Asser's Life of King Alfred, together with the Annals of Saint Neots erroneously ascribed to Asser. Oxford: Clarendon Press. ISBN 0198210211. IA gri_33125000734208.
- Pierce, Thomas Jones (1959). "Rhodri Mawr ('the Great') (died 877), king of Gwynedd, Powys, and Deheubarth". Dictionary of Welsh Biography. Aberystwyth: National Library of Wales.
- Thornton, David E. (2004). "Rhodri Mawr, (b. before 844, d. 878) king of Gwynedd". Oxford Dictionary of National Biography (online ed.). Oxford: Oxford University Press. doi:10.1093/ref:odnb/23456. (Subscription, Wikipedia Library access or UK public library membership required.)
- Williams, John, ed. (1860). Annales Cambriæ. London: Longman, Green, Longman, and Roberts. IA annalescambri20will.

Rhodri Mawr Merfynion Died: 878
Regnal titles
Preceded by Merfyn Frych	King of the Isle of Man; 844–878	Succeeded by Anarawd ap Rhodri
Preceded by Merfyn Frych	King of Gwynedd; 844–878	Succeeded by Anarawd ap Rhodri
