= Cadell ap Rhodri =

King of Seisyllwg
- Reign: 872 – 909 AD
- Predecessor: Rhodri Mawr
- Successor: Hywel Dda
- Born: c.850
- Died: 909 AD
- Issue: Hywel Dda; Morgan; Cadwgan
- House: House of Dinefwr
- Father: Rhodri Mawr
- Mother: Angharad

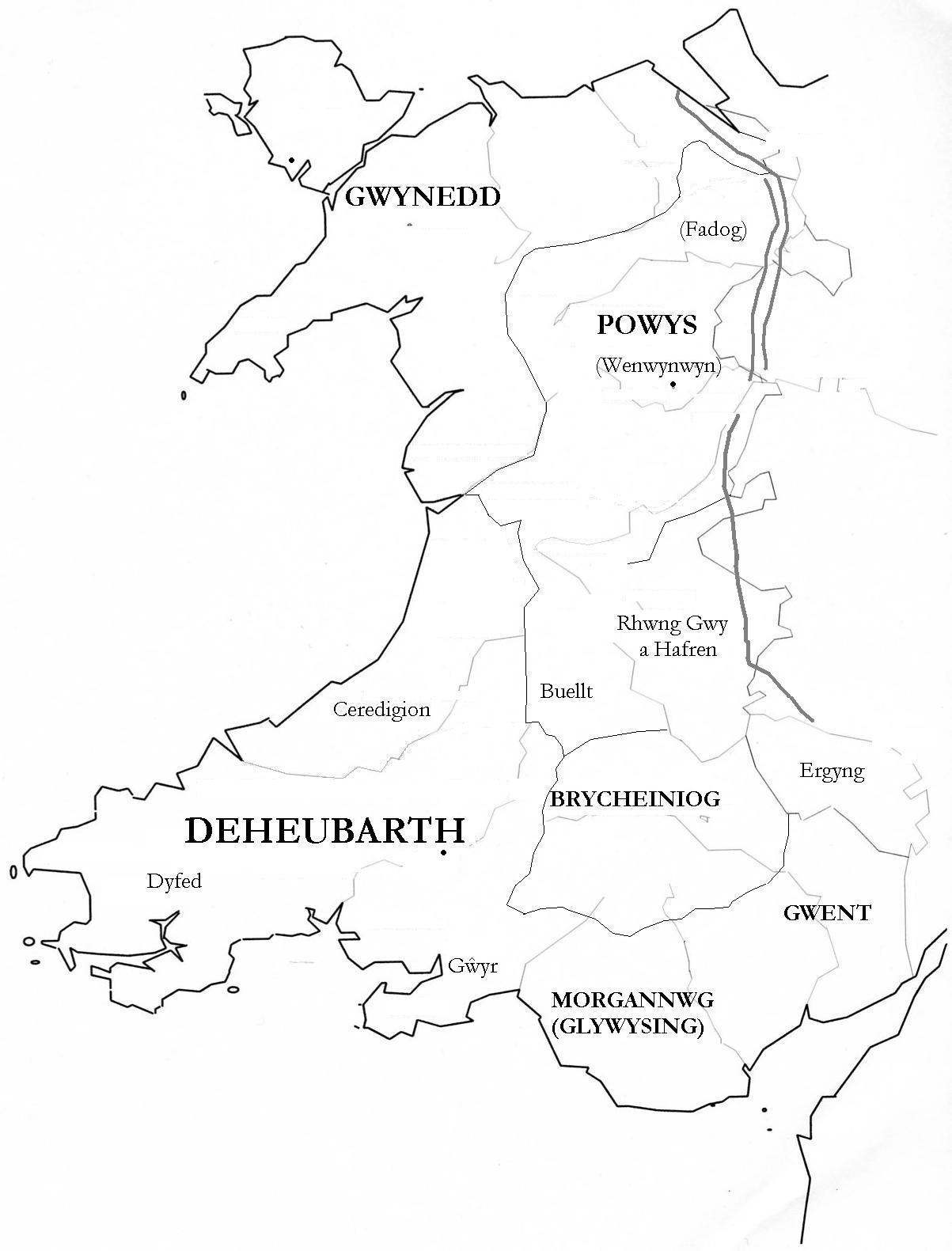
Kingdom of medieval Wales

Cadell ap Rhodri (854–909) was King of Seisyllwg, a minor kingdom in southwestern Wales, from about 872 until his death. The son of Rhodri Mawr, King of Gwynedd, Cadell was in turn the father of Hywel Dda, who eventually came to rule most of Wales and caused Welsh laws to be codified. Cadell is considered the founder of the Welsh royal House of Dinefwr.

== Life ==
Cadell was the second son of King Rhodri the Great of Gwynedd and Angharad ferch Meurig, a princess from Seisyllwg. He was named after his great great grandfather Cadell ap Brochwel of Powys, whose daughter Nest was the mother of his paternal grandfather Merfyn Frych. His older brother was Anarawd (Rhodri's successor as king in Gwynedd), and Merfyn, assumed to be a younger brother due to the pattern of inheritance of terriitories, is sometimes said to have been installed as King of Powys. His father was said to have six sons in all but the records are inconclusive on details.

In either 871 or 872, his mother Angharad's brother Gwgon, King of Seisyllwg, drowned crossing the River Llychwr in the Gower while fighting "black pagans" (taken to mean Viking invaders). Gwgon died without leaving an heir, and Rhodri Mawr became steward over the kingdom of Seisyllwg (Ceredigion and Ystrad Tywi). Although Rhodri was unable to make a legal claim to the throne, he was able to install Cadell as a vassal king through his maternal line of descent.

Cadell had four known sons: Hywel Dda, Clydog (d. 920), Morgan and Cadwgan. Cadell and Hywel together also conquered Dyfed in 904–905, establishing Hywel as the king in that region, strengthened by Hywel's marriage to Elen, daughter of Llywarch ap Hyfaidd, King of Dyfed (d. c. 904). Cadell left his territorial holdings to his sons Hywel and Clydog on his death in 909. After his brother's death, Hywel ruled the two kingdoms jointly as Deheubarth.

Cadell had two other sons, Morgan and Cadwgan, who attended the coronation of Eadred, king of England from 946 to 955, alongside Hywel on 26 August 946.

== See also ==
- Kings of Wales family trees

== Footnotes ==
Cadell ap Rhodri Dinefwr Dynasty Born: 854 Died: 909
Preceded by Rhodri the Great	Prince of Seisyllwg; 872–909	Merged by Hywel Dda into Deheubarth
