= Kingdom of Ceredigion =

Post-Roman kingdom in Wales

Coordinates: 53.2333°N 4.0166°W

Kingdom of Ceredigion Teyrnas Ceredigion (Old Welsh)
- Coat of arms

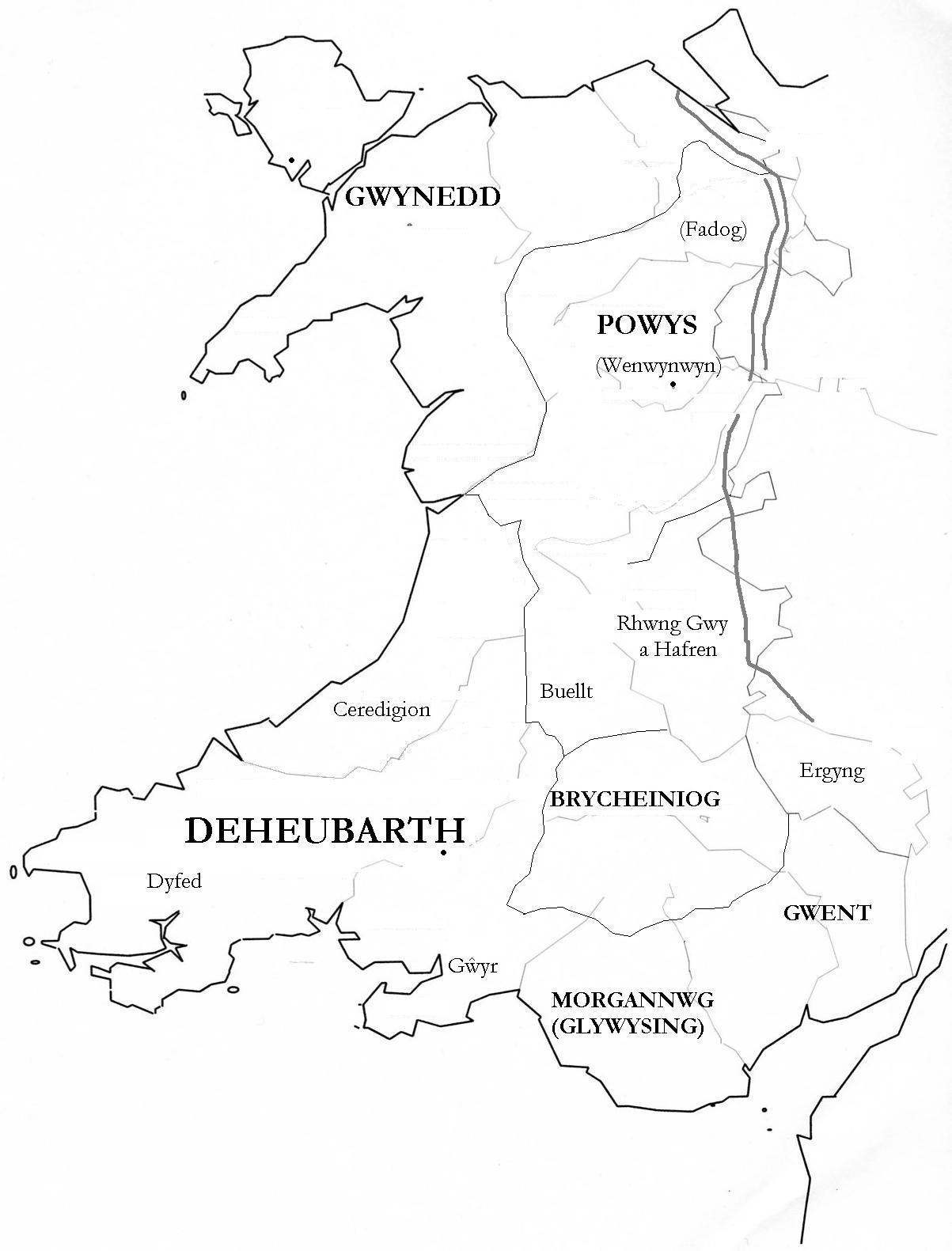
- Medieval kingdoms of Wales
- Common languages: Old Welsh
- Religion: Celtic Christianity
- Historical era: Early Middle Ages
Preceded by	Succeeded by
Demetae	Seisyllwg

The Kingdom of Ceredigion was one of several Welsh kingdoms that emerged in post-Roman Britain in the mid-5th century. Cardigan Bay to the west and the surrounding hilly geography made it difficult for foreign invaders to conquer. Its area corresponded roughly to that of the county of Ceredigion. Ceredigion transparently means "the people of Ceredig". The kingdom as an independent entity ceased to exist around the year 872.

== History ==
Tradition found in the work of Nennius, a 9th century Welsh chronicler, traces Ceredigion's foundation to Ceredig, son of Cunedda. According to Nennius, Cunedda migrated with his sons and followers from the Hen Ogledd (southern Scotland) in the 5th century.

In pre-Roman, and possibly Roman times, a part of southern Ceredigion was in the territory of the Demetae and possibly part of that of the Ordovices. In post-Roman times, however, there is no evidence that the Kingdom of Dyfed included any part of Ceredigion. Modern Ceredigion corresponds almost exactly to the ancient kingdom of Ceredigion. This name is derived from an adjective Cereticianus, itself a derivative of the proper name Cereticus (Cere- dig), known as the son of Cunedda. Though modern Ceredigion corresponds very closely to the old kingdom of Ceredigion, yet it would appear that, in the thirteenth and fourteenth centuries, certain places in Carmarthenshire, situated in the Vale of Cothi, in Cantref Mawr, and far south of the county boundary of the Teifi, were sometimes spoken of as being in Cardiganshire (Ceredigion). The Chronicon of Adam of Usk states that the cwmwd of Caio (properly Cynwyl Caio) was situated "in Comitatu di Cardikan." In the Charter of Talley Abbey, Brechfa is also spoken of as "Lanteilau Brechfa apud Keredigaun." These statements may be simply mistakes, or they may be echoes of the fact that the kings of Ceredigion conquered Y Cantref Mawr in, the eighth century.

The same authority on Welsh topography also deals with the statement given in the Life of St. Carannog, that the River Gwaun, which flows into the sea at Abergwaun (Fishguard), formed the southern boundary of the kingdom, and shows that in an older version of the same, the Teifi is represented more correctly as the southern boundary. The substitution of the Gwaun for the Teifi, is due to the inclusion, in 1291, of the deaneries of Cemaes and Emlyn with Ceredigion, in the Archdeaconry of Cardigan.

== See also ==
- Monarchs of Ceredigion

== Sources ==
- Cambrian Archaeological Association (1906). Archaeologia Cambrensis. W. Pickering.
- Lloyd, J. E. (1911). A History of Wales: From the Norman Invasion to the Edwardian Conquest.
- Morgan, Gerald (2005). Ceredigion, A Wealth of History. Gomer Press. ISBN 1-84323-348-7.
- Owen's Pembrokeshire, vol. I, p. 199, Mr. Egerton Phillimore
- The Kingdom of Ceredigion | A Victim of Medieval Propaganda
