= Annales Cambriae =

Chronicle of medieval British history

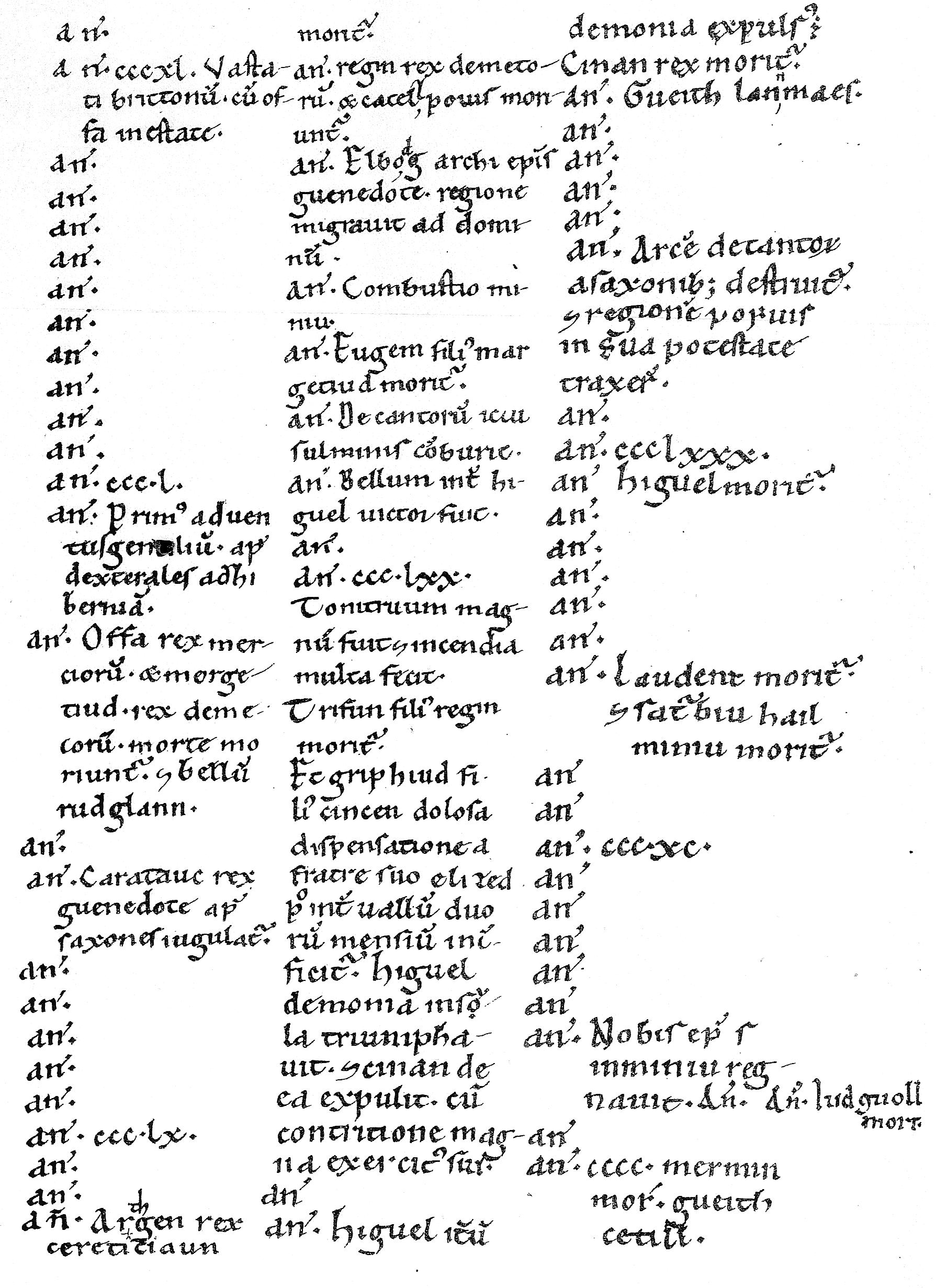
Annales Cambriae: page view from MS. A

The Annales Cambriae (Latin for Annals of Wales) is the title given to a complex of Latin chronicles compiled or derived from diverse sources at St David's in Dyfed, Wales. The earliest is a 12th-century presumed copy of a mid-10th-century original; later editions were compiled in the 13th century. Despite the name, the Annales Cambriae record not only events in Wales, but also events in Ireland, Cornwall, England, Scotland and sometimes further afield, though the focus of the events recorded especially in the later two-thirds of the text is Wales.

== Sources ==
The five principal versions of Annales Cambriae appear in four manuscripts:

- A: London, British Library, Harley MS 3859, folios 190r–193r.
- B: London (Kew), National Archives, MS. E.164/1 (K.R. Misc. Books, Series I) pp. 2–26
- C: London, British Library, MS. Cotton Domitian A.i, folios 138r–155r
- D: Exeter, Cathedral Library, MS. 3514, pp. 523–28, the Cronica ante aduentum Domini.
- E: ibid., pp. 507–19, the Cronica de Wallia.

A is written in a hand of about 1100–1130 AD, and inserted without title into a manuscript (MS) of the Historia Brittonum where it is immediately followed by a pedigree for Owain ap Hywel (died 988). Although no explicit chronology is given in the MS, its annals seem to run from about AD 445 to 977 with the last entry at 954, making it likely that the text belongs to the second half of the 10th century. B was written, probably at the Cistercian abbey of Neath, at the end of the 13th century. It is entitled Annales ab orbe condito adusque A. D. mcclxxxvi [1286]. C is part of a book written at St David's, and is entitled Annales ab orbe condito adusque A. D. mcclxxxviii [1288]; this is also of the late 13th century.

Two of the texts, B and C, begin with a World Chronicle derived from Isidore of Seville's Origines (Book V, ch. 39), through the medium of Bede's Chronica minora. B begins its annals with Julius Caesar's invasion of Britain "sixty years before the incarnation of the Lord." After A.D. 457, B agrees closely with A until A ends. C commences its annals after the empire of Heraclius (AD 610–41) at a year corresponding to AD 677. C mostly agrees with A until A ends, although it is clear that A was not the common source for B and C (Dumville 2002, p. xi). B and C diverge after 1203, C having fewer and briefer Welsh entries.

D and E are found in a manuscript written at the Cistercian abbey of Whitland in south-west Wales in the later 13th century; the Cronica ante aduentum Domini (which takes its title from its opening words) extends from 1132 BC to 1285 AD, while the Cronica de Wallia extends from 1190 to 1266.

A alone has benefited from a complete diplomatic edition (Phillimore 1888).

== Source for the Arthurian legend ==
There are two entries in the Annales on King Arthur, one on Medraut (Mordred), and one on Merlin. These entries have been presented in the past as proof of the existence of Arthur and Merlin, although that view is no longer widely held because the Arthurian entries could have been added arbitrarily as late as 970, long after the development of the early Arthurian myth.

The entries on Arthur and Mordred in the A Text:

Year 72 (c. AD 516) The Battle of Badon, in which Arthur carried the cross of our Lord Jesus Christ on his shoulders for three days and three nights and the Britons were victors.
Year 93 (c. 537) The Strife of Camlann in which Arthur and Medraut (Mordred) fell and there was death in Britain and in Ireland.

Concerning Arthur's cross at the Battle of Badon, it is mirrored by a passage in Nennius where Arthur was said to have borne the image of the Virgin Mary "on his shoulders" during a battle at a castle called Guinnion. The words for "shoulder" and "shield" were, however, easily confused in Old Welsh – *scuit "shield" versus *scuid "shoulder" – and Geoffrey of Monmouth played upon this dual tradition, describing Arthur bearing "on his shoulders a shield" emblazoned with the Virgin.

Merlin (Old Welsh Myrddin) is not mentioned in the A Text, though there is mention of the battle of Arfderydd, associated with him in medieval Welsh literature:

Year 129 (c. 573) The Battle of Armterid

Texts B and C omit the second half of the year 93 entry. B calls Arfderydd "Erderit"; C, "Arderit". In the B Text, the year 129 entry continues: "between the sons of Elifer and Guendoleu son of Keidau in which battle Guendoleu fell and Merlin went mad". Both the B and C texts display the influence of Geoffrey of Monmouth's Historia Regum Britanniae, and this is reflected in the Arfderydd entry by the choice of the Latinized form Merlinus, first found in Geoffrey's Historia, as opposed to the expected Old Welsh form Merdin.

== See also ==
- English historians in the Middle Ages
- History of Wales
