= List of monarchs of Powys =

The Kingdom of Powys covered the eastern part of central Wales. Regions included Builth and Gwerthrynion. It was united with Gwynedd in 854 upon the death of Cyngen ap Cadell by his nephew Rhodri Mawr.

== Rulers of Powys ==
=== Kings of Powys ===
Coat of arms of the Kingdom of Powys (-1160) then the Principality of Powys Wenwynwyn (1160–1283).

The sequence of, and relationships between several, of the earliest recorded rulers of Powys are known primarily from much later sources such as the Harleian Genealogies, which include several contradictory lines of Powysian kings and show every sign of scribal error and in some case deliberate alteration. Therefore, the following list, especially for the semi-legendary House of Gwertherion, cannot be considered certain.

==== House of Gwertherion ====
- Gwrtheyrn (High-King Vortigern), allegedly married to Sevira, daughter of Magnus Maximus
- Cadeyern Fendigaid (c. 430–447), reputed to be the eldest son of Gwrtheyrn
- Cadell Ddyrnllwg (c. 447–460), said in the Historia Brittonum to have been blessed by Saint Germanus and succeeded Benlli Gawr, not Cadeyern.
- Rhuddfedel Frych (c. 480)
- Cyngen Glodrydd (c. 500)
- Pasgen ap Cadeyrn (c. 530)
- Mawgan ap Pasgen (c. 540)
- Brochwel Ysgithrog (c. 550)
- Cynan Garwyn (?–610)
- Selyf ap Cynan (610–613)
- Manwgan ap Selyf (613)
- Eiludd Powys (613–?)
- Beli ap Eiludd (655–695?)
- Gwylog ap Beli (695?–725)
- Elisedd ap Gwylog (725–755?)
- Brochfael ap Elisedd (755?–773)
- Cadell ap Brochfael (773–808)
- Cyngen ap Cadell (808–854) - throne usurped by Rhodri Mawr of Gwynedd and exiled to Rome where the family endured

==== House of Manaw ====
- Rhodri Mawr (854–878) of Gwynedd, allegedly inheriting through his mother Nest, according to some manuscripts. Other manuscripts (e.g. Mostyn manuscript 117) have his mother as Essyllt ferch Cynan (thought to be the daughter of Cynan Dindaethwy of Gwynedd).
- Merfyn ap Rhodri (878–900) (house of Aberffraw)
- Llywelyn ap Merfyn (900–942) (house of Aberffraw)
- Hywel Dda (942–950) (house of Dinefwr usurped from the Aberffraw line of Manaw)
- Owain ap Hywel (950–986) (Mathrafal dynasty, cadet branch of the House of Dinefwr)
- Maredudd ap Owain (986–999)
- Llywelyn ap Seisyll (999–1023), husband of Angharad, daughter of Maredudd ab Owain
- Rhydderch ap Iestyn (1023–1033)
- Iago ap Idwal (1033–1039)
- Gruffydd ap Llywelyn, invader and prince of Gwynedd (1039–1063)

=== Mathrafal Princes of Powys ===
- Bleddyn ap Cynfyn (1063–1075)
- Iorwerth ap Bleddyn (1075–1103 (part))
- Cadwgan ap Bleddyn (1075–1111 (part))
- Owain ap Cadwgan (1111–1116 (part))
- Maredudd ap Bleddyn (1116–1132)
- Madog ap Maredudd (1132–1160)

From 1160 Powys was split into two parts. The southern part was later called Powys Wenwynwyn after Gwenwynwyn ab Owain "Cyfeiliog" ap Madog, while the northern part was called Powys Fadog after Madog ap Gruffydd "Maelor" ap Madog.

== Family tree ==
Rowena	Gwrtheyrn	Serena
Madrun	Vortimer (Brydw)	Cadeyrn Fendigaid	Pasgen	Flaviana	Edeyrn	Scothnoe	Faustus
Cadeyrn Ddyrnllug	Rhuddfedel Frych
Tegid	Gwynfyr Frych	Cyngen Glodrydd	Tudlwystl	Ystradwel	Ddewer	Cadeyrn
Pasgen	Brochfael Ysgithrog	Arddun	Sanan	Cadell	Ieuaf	Maig Myngvras	Mawn
Morgan	Cynan Garwyn	Tysilio	Mawn	Iago
Acca	Selyf Sarffgadau	Eiludd	Dinogan	Afandreg
Manwgan	Donan
Beli
Gwylog	Sanan
Elisedd
Brochfael
Cadell	Cyngen
Nesta	Cyngen

== See also ==
- List of rulers of Wales
- Powys Fadog
- Powys Wenwynwyn
- Mechain
- Edeirnion
