= Church of St Tysilio and St Mary, Meifod =

Church in Powys, Wales

Coordinates: 52.7097°N 3.2516°W

Church of St Tysilio and St Mary
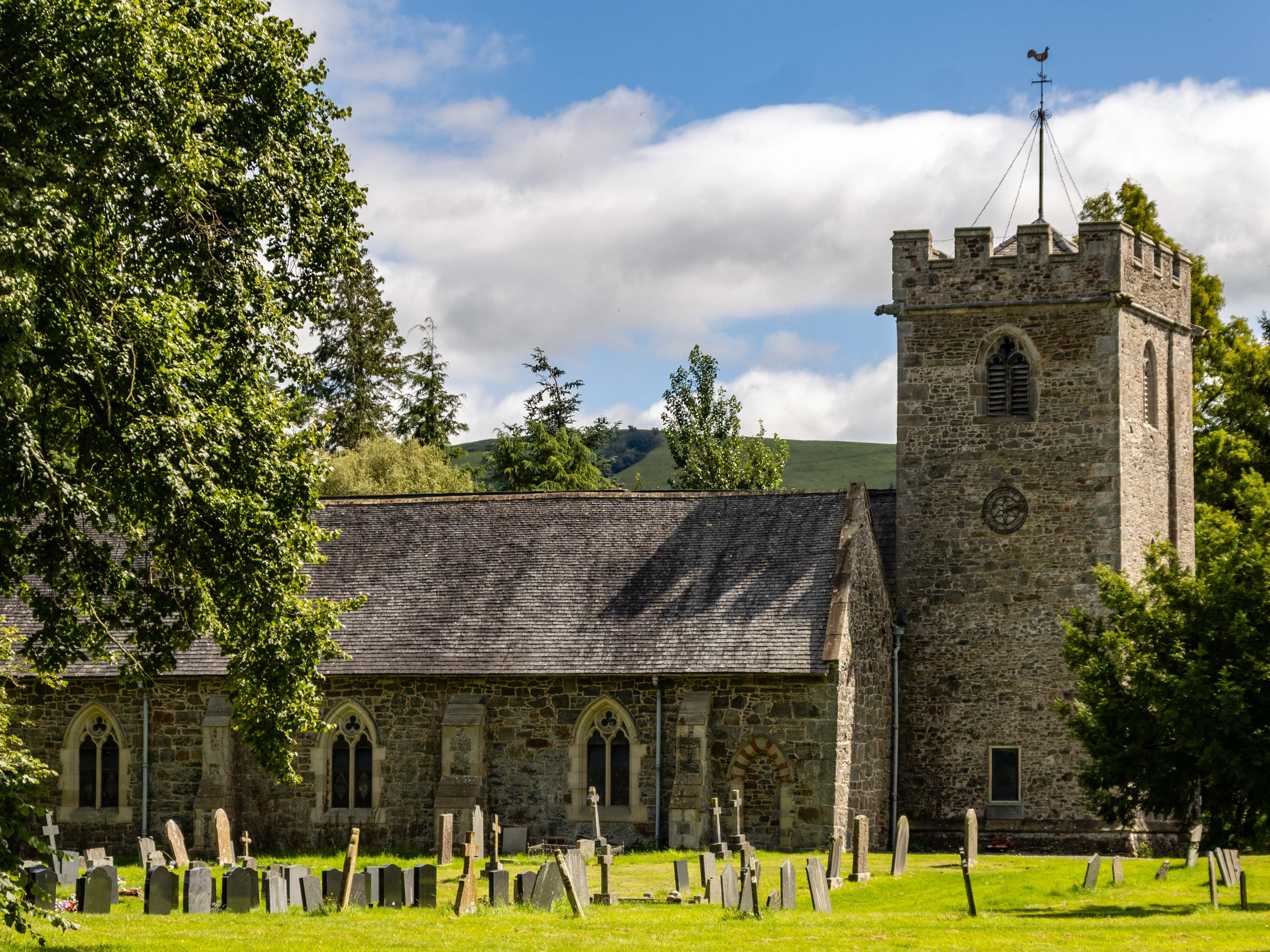

- Location in Powys
- OS grid reference: SJ 155 131
- Location: Meifod, Powys
- Country: Wales
- Denomination: Church in Wales

History
- Status: active
- Dedication: Saints Tysilio and Mary

Architecture
- Heritage designation: Grade I
- Architectural type: Church
- Groundbreaking: 12th century

Administration
- Diocese: St Asaph
- Archdeaconry: Montgomery
- Deanery: Mathrafal
- Parish: Mission Area of Caereinion

The Church of St Tysilio and St Mary is an active parish church in the village of Meifod, Powys, Wales. The village lies seven miles (11 km) north-west of Welshpool. The site has been a centre of Welsh Christianity since c. 500 and the present, unusually large, churchyard forms part of what was an early clas settlement. The origins of the present church are of the 12th century. The dedications are to Saints Tysilio and Mary. Tysilio was a 6th-/7th-century Welsh nobleman and Bishop of St Asaph who reputedly founded an early church, Eglwys Tysilio, at Meifod. The church is a Grade I listed building. The Royal Commission on the Ancient and Historical Monuments of Wales has described St Tysilio and St Mary's as "a display of Welsh Christianity through the centuries".

== History ==
The Church of St Tysilio and St Mary stands in a large churchyard in the centre of Meifod, a small village seven miles (11 km) north-west of Welshpool. The earliest church on the site is attributed to Gwyddfarch, a hermit and tutor to Tysilio, who is reputed to have founded the second church. Tysilio was a son of Brochwel Ysgithrog, King of Powys, whose court is said to have been at Mathrafal, some 3km distant. The site at Meifod became a royal burial ground. A third church, Romanesque in style and to a cruciform plan, was supposedly constructed in the 11th or 12th century by Madog ap Maredudd. The present church dates from the 12th century, although it incorporates many elements of the earlier building and was much later much altered and extended; the doorway is 14th-century, the tower dates to the 15th and the font is of the 17th century. In the 19th century a major restoration was undertaken by Benjamin Ferrey.

Robert Scourfield and Richard Haslam, in their Powys volume in the Buildings of Wales series, note that the length and scale of Meifod's main street reflected the wealth of the area in the 18th and 19th centuries, while the scale and grandeur of the church "testify to far earlier wealth and high status". The church remains an active parish church in the Diocese of St Asaph and regular services are held.

== Architecture and description ==
St Tysilio and St Mary's consists of a combined nave and chancel, a western tower, and north and south aisles. The building material is mainly local rubble, with slate roofs. During Ferrey's restoration in the early 1870s many elements of the earlier church were uncovered built into the fabric of the later church. The church contains stained glass by Henry Hughes and David Evans. The churchyard is unusually large, extending to nine acres. (Note: While Cadw suggests an extent of nine acres, both the Clwyd-Powys Archaeological Trust and Scourfield and Haslam suggest (a still extensive) five acres.)

The Church of St Tysilio and St Mary is as a Grade I listed building. Its Cadw listing record describes it as a "very important medieval church with much of interest and historical significance".

== Sources ==
- Scourfield, Robert; Haslam, Richard (2013). Powys: Montgomeryshire, Radnorshire and Breconshire. The Buildings of Wales. New Haven, US and London: Yale University Press. ISBN 978-0-300-18508-9. OCLC 863678002.
