= Brycheiniog =

Kingdom in mid Wales

Kingdom of Brycheiniog Teyrnas Brycheiniog
- c.450–c. 1045
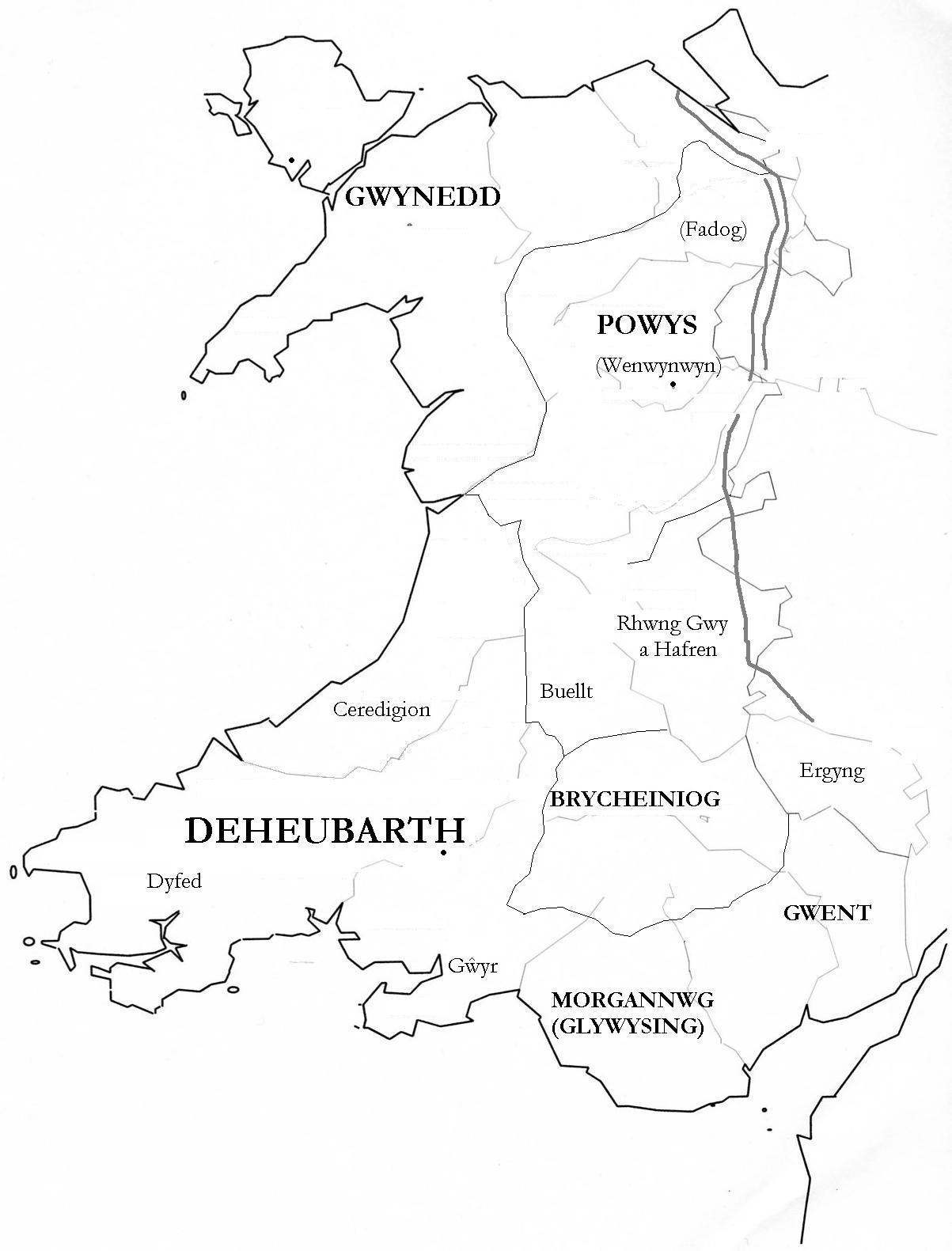
- Medieval kingdoms of Wales.
- Capital: Talgarth
- Common languages: Common Brittonic, Welsh, Latin, and Irish
- Government: Monarchy
  - c.450-490: Brychan Brycheiniog
  - c.650: Cloten of Dyfed
  - 800s: Elisedd ap Tewdwr
  - -c.1045: Gryfydd ap Elisedd
- Historical era: Middle Ages
  - Founded by Brychan Brycheiniog: c.450
  - Death of Gryfydd ap Elisedd: c. 1045
Preceded by	Succeeded by
Roman Britain	Kingdom of Deheubarth; Lordship of Brecon

Brycheiniog was an independent kingdom in South Wales in the Early Middle Ages. It often acted as a buffer state between England to the east and the south Welsh kingdom of Deheubarth to the west. It was conquered and pacified by the Normans between 1088 and 1095, though it remained Welsh in character. It was transformed into the Lordship of Brecknock and later formed the southern and larger part of the historic county of Brecknockshire. To its south was the Kingdom of Morgannwg.

The main legacy of the kingdom of Brycheiniog is etymological and geographical. It is used in Bannau Brycheiniog, the Welsh name for the Brecon Beacons range and, since 2023, in name used for the range's national park. Its name is also the origin to the anglicised names Brecknockshire (retained in Welsh as Sir Frycheiniog, 'the shire of Brycheiniog'), and Brecon (otherwise known as Aberhonddu in Welsh).

== History ==
=== Origins ===
The kingdom of Brycheiniog was probably founded by Irish raiders in the late fifth century, very likely the Uí Liatháin, whose power had grown great in Wales until they were reduced by the sons of Cunedda (although this may just be propaganda for Gwynedd's power) as reported in the Historia Brittonum. Traditionally, it was founded by and named after a legendary Hiberno-Welsh prince named Brychan out of the old Welsh kingdom of Garth Madrun (believed to have been centered on Talgarth) in the mid-5th century, though this event is shrouded in legend. Brychan was a son of Anlach, an Irish settler who had peacefully taken control of the area by marrying Marchell, the heiress of Garth Madrun. Tradition says that Brychan fathered an extremely large number of children, many becoming saints in Wales and Cornwall. Brychan's eldest son (or grandson, depending on which manuscripts are reliable), Rhain Dremrudd (i.e. Rhain the red-faced), founded a dynasty which ruled the kingdom uninterrupted until the mid 7th century; manuscripts list his descendants (and successors) as:

- Rhigeneu ap Rhain
- Llywarch ap Rhygeneu
- Idwallon ap Llywarch.
- Rhiwallon ap Idwallon

During this era, the Irish raiders had begun to invade various western parts of Britain, with Triffyn Farfog (son of Aed Brosc, a Deisi magnate) already having taken over Dyfed from Edynfed's heirs. Traditional Welsh accounts claim that Triffyn had gained his power by peaceably marrying Edynfed's heiress (they do not indicate whether this was under duress). The power of Irish raiders, particularly the Uí Liatháin, grew increasingly strong, and was not weakened until it was reduced by the sons of Cunedda, as reported in the Historia Brittonum. However Irish presence remained in the south leaving many historians to theorise Cunedda faced strong resistance in the south.

Traditionally, Tewdrig carved out from his lands the region around Talgarth (Garth Madrun) as a dowry for his daughter, Marchell, when she married Brychan mac Anlach, the grandson of Triffyn's fraternal nephew, Cormac mac Urb, in the mid 5th century. The remainder of Tewdrig's lands — Gwent — was inherited by Tewdrig's son.

Historical sources of a much later date, such as the 12th century Book of Llandaff, name the next three generations of rulers of the eastern part — the descendants of Tudwal — as:

- Teithrin ap Tudwal
- Teithfallt ap Teithrin
- Tewdrig ap Teithfallt

In the time of Idwallon, the aggressive Cynan Garwyn (king of Powys) invaded a number of lands, including Brycheiniog. Rhiwallon succeeded due to the subsequent collapse of Powysian power, under pressure from Dogfeiling, and the extreme youth of Cynan's later successor.

=== Union with Dyfed ===
Rhiwallon is the last direct male descendant of Brychan reported by any historic manuscript. His daughter and heiress, Queen Ceindrych, married Cloten, the king of Dyfed. This 7th century marriage united the Kingdoms of Brycheiniog and Dyfed (which bordered each other at the time), a union which lasted for about a century (though parts of Brycheiniog may have been granted out, from time to time, as lordships for younger sons).

In the mid 8th century, King Seisyll of Ceredigion invaded, conquering Ystrad Tywi, and thus physically cleaving apart Dyfed and Brycheiniog. Rhain ap Cadwgan, great-grandson of Cloten and King of Dyfed-Brycheiniog, initially attempted to retain the union; the surviving parts were consequently known as Rheinwg.

The impracticalities of ruling two regions physically separated by a rival kingdom meant that Rhain's brother, Awst, was eventually made governor of Brycheiniog, while Rhain directly ruled only Dyfed. Following the death of Rhain and Awst, Rhain's son Tewdwr challenged the authority of Awst's son Elwystl. According to the Book of Llandaff, they were persuaded to divide Brycheiniog between them, swearing on the altar of Llandaff Cathedral to keep to this settlement. Soon after, Tewdwr murdered Elwysti, regaining the whole of Brycheiniog. The Church apparently forced him to donate Cwmdu to the church, as punishment for breaking his oath.

=== Unclear events ===
At this point, records about Brycheiniog's leadership become primarily genealogical, and certainly vague, but are unfortunately quite inconsistent with one another, and appear sometimes to be confused with genealogies of other realms. There are a number of possible conclusions:

- that Rhain's son Tewdwr (also known as Tewdos) had two sons, Maredudd and Nowy Hen, between whom the land was divided; Maredudd received Dyfed and Nowy Hen received Brycheiniog. In conjunction with this,
  - that Tewdos' mother (Rhain's wife) was the daughter of Elisedd ap Gwylog (king of Powys) and Sanan(t) ferch Nowy, Cloten's younger sister; that her grandson Nowy Hen was the father of Gruffydd;
  - alternatively, that (as in Jesus College Manuscript 20), Nowy Hen had a son named Elisse, whose daughter was Sanan(t); Sanan(t) and an unnamed king of Powys were the parents of Gruffydd;
- alternatively, that Rhain had three or four sons (Tewdos, Naufedd Hen, Tewdwr, and possibly also Elisse) between whom the land was divided; Dyfed going to Tewdos (whose son was the Maredudd who inherited Dyfed), Naufedd Hen receiving Cantref Selyf of Brycheiniog, Tewdwr receiving Cantref Tewdos, and Elisse (or Naufedd Hen, if Elisse did not exist) receiving the remainder of Brycheiniog. In close union with this alternative, that Tewdwr's son and heir was also named Elisse, and his daughter Sanan(t) married Nowy, an unidentified king, whose son was Gruffydd; Naufedd Hen, meanwhile, was the great-great-grandfather of a man named Elisse ap Gwylog (e.g. as in Peniarth Manuscript 131).

Complicating matters further, Tangwydd ap Tegid, the king of Ferlix (the adjacent realm at the heart of Rhwng Gwy a Hafren) gained a claim on Brycheiniog by marrying a daughter of Elwystl, or of Rhain's grandson Elisse ap Tewdwr / Elisse ap Nowy Hen, who had only daughters.

Geoffrey of Monmouth identifies Gruffydd (as Grifud map Nogoid - i.e. Gruffudd ap Nowy) as one of the princes present at the coronation of King Arthur. The Harleian Chronicle states that in 848 (about the time of Gruffudd, or his son Tewdwr), Ithel ap Hywel (king of Gwent) was killed by men from Brycheiniog in the Battle of Ffinnant (probably referring to either the Ffinnant near Soar in Brycheiniog, or the Ffinnant near Duhonw in Buellt); the cause and participants of the battle are not otherwise reported, but the Chronicle of the Princes states that the killing of Ithel had become infamous as treachery, possibly implying that he had been on the Brycheiniog side of the battle.

Subsequent kings of Ferlix descended from Tangwydd are identified in the Book of Baglan as also ruling Brycheiniog, even though this raises the question of how Gruffudd's descendants could rule it at the same time; possibly this is what led to the Battle at Ffinnant.

=== Dependency ===
Gruffydd (whoever his parents were), had a grandson – Elisse ap Tewdwr (also known as Elisedd) – who is described in the records as being king of Brycheiniog in the time of King Alfred. In Elisse's time, the Viking raids threatened Brycheiniog, so in the 880s Elisse became a vassal of Alfred, to help protect his realm; indeed, in the spring of 896, Brycheiniog, Gwent and Gwynllwg were devastated by the Norsemen who had wintered at Quatford near Bridgnorth that year. According to Asser's contemporary account, Elisse also feared the malevolence of the kings of Seisyllwg and Gwynedd who had succeeded Rhodri Mawr; his vassalage to Alfred provided him with potential support against Seisyllwg.

According to an early 14th century writer, a king of Brycheiniog and Ferlix named Hwgan (Huganus in Latin), noting that Edward the Elder (king of Mercia) was preoccupied by the Great Heathen Army, attempted to conquer (or raid) Mercia. He had not known Edward's sister, Æthelflæd (the daughter of King Alfred and widow of Earl Æthelred of Mercia), would be a force to be reckoned with; Æthelflæd successfully resisted his attempts, and, in the early summer of 916, pushed her advantage by invading Brycheiniog. On 19 June, Æthelflæd stormed the royal llys (court) in Llangorse lake, and captured the queen of the land and 34 others. Hwgan responded by seeking an alliance with the Danes, but died soon afterwards while defending Derby (a Danish-held city) from the Saxons. The earlier Anglo-Saxon Chronicle also reports these events, but without naming the Brycheiniog king, or mentioning his raid against Mercia; it was, though, Æthelflæd who defeated the Danes at Derby.

As a result of Hwgan's behaviour, his son, Dryffin (also known as Tryffin) was forced by King Athelstan to pay tribute. Athelstan's godson and namesake, Elystan Glodrydd, deprived Dryffin of Ferlix, merging it with his own realm of Buellt. Nevertheless, records like the Book of Baglan still have Dryffin's descendants as rulers of Brycheiniog; Hwgan (and hence Dryffin) is named there as a direct descendant of Tangwydd. What state the kingship of Brycheiniog was in at this time is not completely certain; Elisse ap Tewdwr's son, Tewdwr ap Elisse, was certainly ruling between 927 and 929. Tewdwr ap Elisse is reported to have witnessed a charter at the English royal court in 934, along with Hywel Dda.

After Tewdwr ap Elisse, no more kings of Brycheiniog are recorded from his line. Gerald of Wales states that after Tewdwr's death, Brycheiniog was divided between the three sons of Tewdwr's brother, Griffri: Tewdos (or Tewdwr), Selyf, and Einon; the three cantrefi of Brycheiniog: Tewdos (also known as Mawr), Selyf, and Talgarth were their respective portions. Tewdwr ap Griffri is the last of his line to be named in the Jesus College genealogies.

Several genealogical manuscripts report that Dryffin's son, Maenyrch, married the daughter of Selyf's granddaughter, Elinor. The Book of Baglan reports that Maenyrch's son Bleddyn became king of Brycheiniog; Bleddyn was the ruler at the time of the Norman invasion of England. Bleddyn married the sister of Rhys ap Tewdwr, the king of Deheubarth.

=== End of the kingdom ===
Many Welsh princes had been vassals or allies of the Saxon kings, so actively supported the rebellion of Eadric the Wild against the Norman presence in England. In 1070, after suppressing Eadric's forces in England, William FitzOsbern, 1st Earl of Hereford, attacked South Wales, defeating three of its kings (but notably, he is not described as having defeated a king of Brycheiniog). This past behaviour of Welsh princes naturally made the Normans ill-disposed towards them when an anti-Norman revolt broke out in Northern England ten years later.

Over the previous century, Deheubarth had been contested between the heirs of Maredudd ab Owain's brother Einion (such as Hywel ab Edwin), those of his daughter Angharad (such as Gruffydd ap Llywelyn), and the rulers of Morgannwg. Rhys was of Einion's line. In 1088, Gruffydd's son-in-law, and his son-in-law's son-in-law, Bernard de Neufmarché, took part in a rebellion against King William Rufus, without being punished for it. Emboldened by this, Bernard launched attacks on an area under Rhys' influence – Brycheiniog – while the sons of Bleddyn ap Cynfyn, Gruffydd's half-brother, attacked Deheubarth; this was likely a co-ordinated action between Bernard and Bleddyn's sons. Bleddyn was defeated at the Battle of Caer-Bannau (one of Bleddyn's castles, and a former Roman army camp), while Rhys was forced to flee to Ireland.

An undated charter of Bernard de Neufmarché mentioned "all the tithes of his lordship which he had in Brycheiniog in the woods and plains" (as well as Glasbury). In 1655, this charter was included in a publication (Monasticon Anglicanum by Roger Dodsworth) which amalgamated it with another of Bernard's charters, the latter being dated 1088; the charter mentioning Brycheiniog was then republished in an 1867 work (Historia et cartularium Monasterii Sancti Petri Gloucestriae by William Hart), with the added marginal gloss "AD 1088"; some people conclude from the 1867 gloss that Bernard must already have regarded himself as lord of all Brycheiniog in 1088.

With Irish aid, Rhys gradually re-established himself in Deheubarth. In 1093, Bernard replaced Caer-Bannau, by constructing a more militarily advanced castle – Brecon Castle – at a more strategic location three miles away, demolishing Caer-Bannau to re-use the material. Rhys and Bleddyn sought to use this to their advantage, by attacking Bernard while the new castle was unfinished, but at the subsequent Battle of Brecon, in April that year, Rhys and Bleddyn were killed; the Welsh Annales clearly state that Rhys was killed "by the French who were inhabiting Brycheiniog" (which also implies that the kingdom of Brycheiniog had been destroyed by this point).

The lands of Brycheiniog became Bernard's Lordship of Brecknock, ruled by his descendants for many years. Bernard confined Bleddyn's eldest son, Gwrgan, in Brecon Castle (though Gwrgan was allowed to travel elsewhere, if accompanied by Bernard's knights); nevertheless, Bernard gave Gwrgan, and his brother, some lands within Bernard's Lordship, to sustain their dignity.

From Gwrgan descends Rhys ap Hywel, who was one of the search party who caught King Edward II, in 1326, resulting in Edward's effective, and then actual, imprisonment for the rest of his life. Rhys ap Hywel's second son was Einion Sais, who militarily supported the campaigns of Edward's son, King Edward III; Einion's great-great grandson was Sir Dafydd Gam, an enemy of Owain Glyndŵr and hero of Agincourt, from whom descend the present Earls of Pembroke.

== Historical references ==
- Remfry, P.M., Castell Bwlch y Dinas and the Families of Fitz Osbern, Neufmarché, Gloucester, Hereford, Braose, Fitz Herbert (ISBN 1-899376-79-8)
- Remfry, P.M., Annales Cambriae. A Translation of Harleian 3859; PRO E.164/1; Cottonian Domitian, A 1; Exeter Cathedral Library MS. 3514 and MS Exchequer DB Neath, PRO E (ISBN 1-899376-81-X)
