= Rhain ap Cadwgan =

Welsh king (died c. 740)

Rhain ap Cadwgan (English: Regin son of Cadogan; died c. 740) was an 8th-century king of Dyfed and Brycheiniog in Wales of the Early Middle Ages. He succeeded his father Cadwgan, who succeeded his father Caten ap Cloten.

== Biography ==
Rhain's great-grandfather, Cloten, had married the heiress of Brycheiniog, Queen Ceindrych of Brycheiniog briefly uniting the two kingdoms. During Rhain's rule, however, King Seisyll of Ceredigion invaded Dyfed and annexed its Cantref Ystrad Tywi (c. 710), cleaving apart Rhain's realm; Ceredigion and Ystrad Tywi were merged by Seisyll to form Seisyllwg. Sometime after this, the reduced Dyfed-Brycheiniog was briefly called Rhainwg, but the detached parts could not be maintained as a unit, and Rhain's younger brother - Awst (English: Augustus) - was appointed as a governor of Brycheiniog.

Rhain's son, Tewdws succeeded him in Dyfed. Following Awst's death, Tewdws asserted his right to Brycheiniog, only allowing Awst's son, Elwystl, to rule a sub-division of it. Tewdws later murdered Elwystl, forcibly re-establishing Rhainwg.

== Three brothers: Tewdos, Gruffudd and Caten ==
The various manuscripts identifying Rhain's wife and immediate descendants are particularly inconsistent, and muddled. There are a number of possible conclusions:

- that Rhain's son Tewdos (also known as Tewdwr) had two sons - Maredudd and Nowy Hen, between whom the land was divided; Maredudd received Dyfedd and Nowy Hen received Brycheiniog. In syzygy with this,
  - that Tewdos' mother (Rhain's wife) was the daughter of Elisedd ap Gwylog (the king of Powys) and Sanan(t) ferch Nowy, Cloten's younger sister; that her grandson - Nowy Hen - was the father of Grufydd.
  - alternatively, that (as in Jesus College Manuscript 20), Sanan(t) was the daughter of Elisse, the son of Nowy Hen; Sanan(t) and an unnamed king of Powys were the parents of Grufydd
- alternatively, that Rhain had three or four sons - Tewdos, Naufedd Hen, Tewdwr, and possibly also Elisse - between whom the land was divided; Dyfed going to Tewdos (whose son Maredudd inherited it from him), Naufedd Hen receiving Cantref Selyf of Brycheiniog, Tewdwr receiving Cantref Mawr, and Elisse (or Naufedd Hen, if Elisse didn't exist) receiving the remainder of Brycheiniog. In close-union with this alternative, that Tewdwr's son and heir was also named Elisse, and his daughter Sanan(t) married Nowy, an unidentified king, whose son was Gruffydd; Naufedd Hen, meanwhile, was the great-great-grandfather of a man named Elisse ap Gwylog (eg. as in Peniarth Manuscript 131).

Preceded by Cloten of Dyfed and Brycheiniog	King of Dyfed to c. 740	Succeeded by Tewdws ap Rhain
Preceded by Cloten of Dyfed and Brycheiniog	King of Brycheiniog to c. 740	Succeeded by Tewdwr ap Rhain
