= Cadelling (Powys) =

Welsh dynastic family

- Country: Kingdom of Powys
- Founded: c. 440; 1586 years ago
- Founder: Cadell Ddyrnllwg
- Final ruler: Elisedd ap Cyngen?
- Deposition: before 886; 1140 years ago

The dynasty of the Cadelling was a dynasty in early medieval Wales which was strongly associated with the Kingdom of Powys, though the name Powys is only first attested in a text from the year 829. Members of this family claimed descent from Cadell Ddyrnllwg, a porter who according to legend was raised to the kingship by Germanus of Auxerre. They were deposed by the Second Dynasty of Gwynedd before the year 886, but the family still existed in the twelfth century, when members of the dynasty were commemorated in a poem by Cynddelw Brydydd Mawr as one of the main noble families of Powys.

== Bibliography ==
- Charles-Edwards, Thomas (2013). Wales and the Britons, 350-1064. Oxford: Oxford University Press. ISBN 9780198217312. IA walesbritons35010000char.
- Jones, Nerys Ann; Parry Owen, Ann, eds. (1991). Gwaith Cynddelw Brydydd Mawr (in Welsh). Vol. 1. Cardiff: University of Wales Press. ISBN 9780708310861.
