= Meifod =

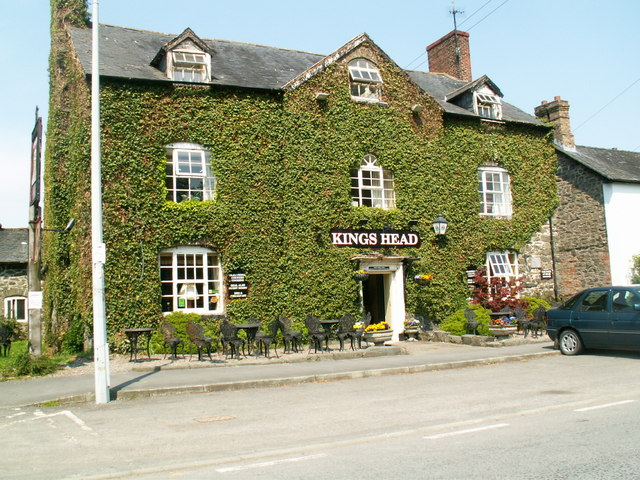
- The King's Head Inn

- Location within Powys
- Population: 1,322 (2011)
- OS grid reference: SJ154133
- Community: Meifod
- Principal area: Powys
- Preserved county: Powys
- Country: Wales
- Sovereign state: United Kingdom
- Post town: LLANFYLLIN
- Postcode district: SY22
- Post town: MEIFOD
- Postcode district: SY22
- Dialling code: 01938
- Police: Dyfed-Powys
- Fire: Mid and West Wales
- Ambulance: Welsh
- UK Parliament: Montgomeryshire and Glyndŵr
- Senedd Cymru – Welsh Parliament: Montgomeryshire
- List of places UK Wales Powys 52.71°N 3.25°W Community map: Map of the community

Meifod, formerly also written Meivod (Welsh pronunciation), is a small village, community and electoral ward seven miles (11 km) north-west of Welshpool in Montgomeryshire, Powys, Wales, on the A495 road and located in the valley of the River Vyrnwy. The River Banwy has a confluence with the Vyrnwy approximately two miles (3.2 km) to the west of the village. The village itself had a population of 317. The community also includes the village of Bwlch-y-cibau.

== History ==
Although the Roman town of Mediolanum of the Antonine Itinerary has since been identified as Whitchurch in Shropshire, Meifod is sometimes identified as the Mediolanum among the Ordovices described in Ptolemy's Geography, although others argue for Llanfyllin or Caersws.

Meifod is about two miles (3.2 km) north-east of the royal residence of the Princes of Wales at Mathrafal, and it was an early Christian centre known at Caer Meguaidd or Meguaid; It is associated with St Gwyddfarch in the 6th century and St Tysilio in the 7th. Tysilio's father was Brochwel Ysgithrog, a prince of Powys, who made Meifod his summer residence. The first Christian foundation was probably a clas and a monastery in the early medieval period. A church built by Madog ap Maredudd, the last prince of the entire Kingdom of Powys, and dedicated to St Fair, was consecrated in 1156. The same churchyard once contained three separate churches; Eglwys Gwydafarch, Eglwys Fair and Eglwys Tysilio.

The churchyard is said to contain the royal tombs of Madog ap Maredudd (d. 1160) and his son Gruffydd Maelor (d. 1191), Prince of Powys Fadog. There is also a stone slab in the church dated late-9th or early-10th century, although very weathered the decorations on it are still clear and include a large cross and a smaller cross in a circle, it is assumed that it once covered a tomb.

The village has never been served by a railway. However the Llanfyllin Branch line ran a few miles north east of the village and the Welshpool and Llanfair Light Railway terminus is in the nearby town of Llanfair Caereinion.

The village lies in the floodplain of the River Vyrnwy and was flooded in 1955.

The Barony of Main-yn-Meifod belonged the House of Mathrafal through the members of the House of Powys, such as Iorwerth Goch, his son Iorwerth Vychan, and his grandson Madoc Vychan.

The 2015 National Eisteddfod of Wales took place at Meifod between 1 and 8 August 2015. It was the last National Eisteddfod to use the "iconic" pink pavilion tent.

== Religion ==
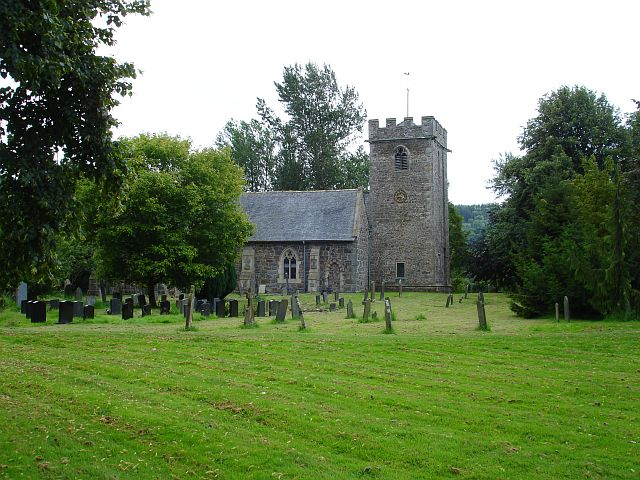
The church of SS. Tysilio and Mary

At the village centre is the Church of St Tysilio and St Mary which occupies a very large site; the building includes material with a wide range of ages some dated to the 12th century. In addition, in common with many Welsh villages, there are a number of Nonconformist chapels within the village and its catchment area.

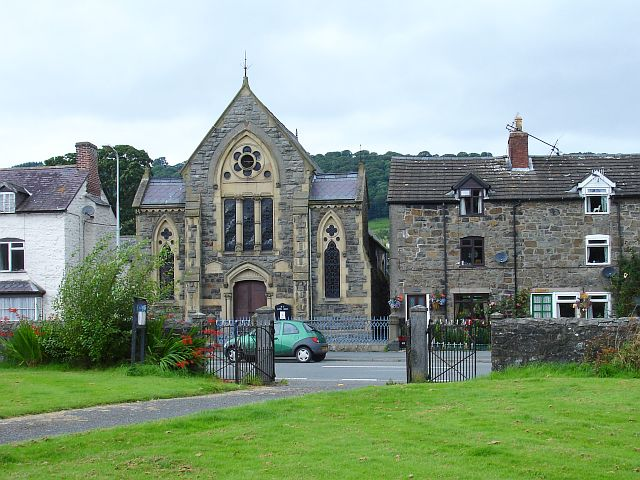
The Calvinistic Methodist Chapel

== Buildings ==
The village has one pub, the King's Head and a convenience store (with a post office). In 2006, local rugby union team C.O.B.R.A built a new rugby clubhouse and two pitches. The village football team plays in the amateur division. The village also has a primary school, Ysgol Meifod (formerly Meifod County Primary (or CP) School) and a modern village hall located next door which provides facilities for a wide variety of clubs and societies.

Bryngwyn Hall, to the north, is a late 18th century country house designed by Robert Mylne. It is a Grade II* listed building and its Victorian park is listed, also at Grade II*, on the Cadw/ICOMOS Register of Parks and Gardens of Special Historic Interest in Wales.

Dyffryn Hall, a Georgian period manor house, is situated to the west of the village and was home to Clement Davies, the Montgomeryshire MP and leader of the post-war Liberal Party between 1945 and 1956.

== Demographics ==
57% of the population of Meifod were born in England. However, this is not in itself evidence of any large-scale immigration from England; it may simply reflect the preference of local parents for using larger hospitals more conveniently situated in nearby Shropshire for giving birth. The United Kingdom Census 2001 revealed that some 38% of the population over 3 years old had some knowledge of the Welsh language, with almost 20% able to speak, read and write in Welsh. The Meifod valley hosted the National Eisteddfod in 2003 and 2015.
