= Elisedd =

Elisedd is a masculine given name. Notable people with the name include:

- Elisedd ap Cyngen, king of Powys
- Elisedd ap Gwylog, king of Powys
- Elisedd ap Tewdwr, king of Brycheiniog

== See also ==
- Brochfael ab Elisedd, king of Powys
