= Pasgen ap Cadeyrn =

King of Powys

Pasgen ap Cadeyrn was an ancient king of Powys and the father of Mawgan ap Pasgen, according to the Harleian genealogies. The Welsh genealogies, however, are unreliable from his father's name on. Pasgen's name also appears on the Pillar of Eliseg and as well as the Historia Brittonum as a son of Vortigern. In the genealogies from Jesus College MS 20, his father is Cadell Ddyrnllug and his son's name is Manogan. In the Harleian, he is a grandson of Cadell through Cadeyrn (Cattegirn).

One reading of the genealogies would put the beginning of his reign about two centuries before the death of Selyf ap Cynan, or about AD 417; another would put him in the period 480–510.

Preceded by Cadeyrn?	King of Powys c. 417	Succeeded by Mawgan ap Pasgen
