= Rheinwg =

Former kingdom in south Wales

Kingdom of Rheinwwg Teyrnas Rheinwg (Welsh)
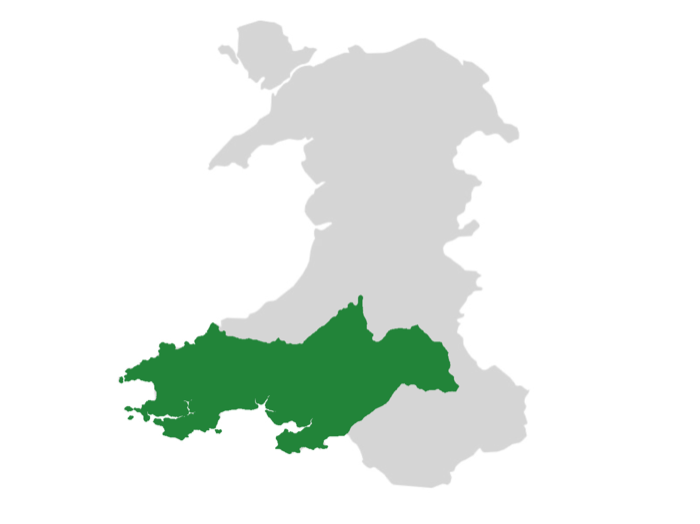
- Map combining the Kingdom of Dyfed and the Kingdom of Brycheiniog
- Common languages: Old Welsh, Vulgar Latin, Old Irish
- Government: Monarchy
- Historical era: Middle Ages
Preceded by	Succeeded by
sub-Roman Britain	Deheubarth; Lordship of Brecknock

The Kingdom of Rheinwg (Welsh: Teyrnas Rheinwg) was a Brittonic kingdom, in the south of modern-day Wales, which is often thought to have been a union of the kingdoms of Dyfed and Brycheiniog

== History ==
Rheinwg emerged during the early medieval period as a territorial designation for the expanded kingdom of Dyfed, which incorporated Brycheiniog by the 8th century. The union originated under Cloten of Dyfed and Brycheiniog (fl. c. 650 CE), who married Ceindrych, heiress of Brycheiniog, consolidating both regions under a single dynasty. This union persisted until the early 8th century, when Rhain ap Cadwgan (d. c. 740) ruled the combined realm.

The kingdom’s territorial integrity was challenged by Seisyll of Ceredigion, who annexed Ystrad Tywi (a region of Dyfed) c. 710 CE. The remaining territories of Dyfed and Brycheiniog were subsequently termed Rheinwg, likely named after Rhain ap Cadwgan. By the 12th century, Rheinwg’s geographic scope had become obscure, with later scholars misinterpreting its boundaries. According to the Annales Cambriae Rheinwg was devastated by Offa of Mercia in 797.

== Kings of Rheinwg ==
- Rhain ap Cadwgan
- Tewdws ap Rhain
- Cloten of Dyfed and Brycheiniog
- Cynan Garwyn

== Bibliography ==
Bartrum, P.C. (1993). A Welsh Classical Dictionary : People in History and Legend up to about A.D. 1000. The National Library of Wales.

Bromwich, R. (2014). Trioedd Ynys Prydein. 4th ed. University of Wales Press, pp. 75–76, 162, 508–509.

Davies, J. (2007). A History of Wales. London: Penguin, pp. 3–5.

Green, E.T. (1911). Meeting at Gogerddan. Transactions and archaeological record, Cardiganshire Antiquarian Society, 1(1), pp. 24–26.

Guy, B. (2019) Rheinwg: The Lost Kingdom of South Wales (https://api.repository.cam.ac.uk/server/api/core/bitstreams/d538ef2f-383d-4ca0-99f2-0327ed90f27f/content)

Lloyd, Sir John Edward (1912). https://archive.org/details/ahistorywalesfr00lloygoog

Bartrum, Peter C. A Welsh Classical Dictionary: People in History and Legend up to about A.D.1000. National Library of Wales, 1993. p. 633.

Cymmrodor : — Cymmrodorion Society., 1892. — P. 141.

Phillimore, E. (1888–1897). Notes on Welsh historical texts. Y Cymmrodor, 9–12
