= Cynan Garwyn =

Welsh king

Cynan Garwyn was king of Powys in the north-east and east of Wales, who flourished in the second half of the 6th century. Little reliable information exists which can be used to reconstruct the background and career of the historical figure. Available materials include early Welsh poetry, genealogies and hagiography, which are often late and of uncertain value.

== Putative biography ==
He is thought to have been a son of his predecessor Brochwel Ysgithrog and his wife Arddun Penasgell, and the father of Selyf Sarffgadau, who may have succeeded him. Later Welsh genealogies trace his lineage to Cadell Ddyrnllug. His epithet Garwyn, possibly Carwyn, has been explained as meaning either "of the White Thigh" or "of the White Chariot". Cynan may be the same person as Aurelius Caninus, one of the Welsh tyrants who are fiercely criticised by the mid-6th-century cleric Gildas in his De Excidio et Conquestu Britanniae, but there is also a possibility that the latter refers to Cynin ap Millo, a relative of Cynan's.

Cynan is the addressee of a poem ascribed to Taliesin, Trawsganu Kynan Garwyn Mab Brochfael, which, though first attested in the fourteenth-century Book of Taliesin, might actually date back to the sixth century. Here he is presented as a warlord who led many successful campaigns throughout Wales: on the River Wye, against the men of Gwent, on Anglesey, and in Dyfed (where his opponent in Dyfed may have been Aergul Lawhir ap Tryffin), Brycheiniog and Cornwall ("Cernyw" in Welsh); although the latter is likely a mistranslation of the Cornovii, who had formed the kingdom of Pengwern to the east of Powys. Unlike his son, he is never described as having faced the English in battle.

The saints' lives highlight a more peaceful side to Cynan's reign, but as these works are late and were written to demonstrate the powers of the saints, rather little credence can be given to them. In Lifris' Life of St Cadog, abbot of Llancarfan (written c. 1100), Cynan Garwyn intends to undertake a raid against Glamorgan, whose king is so terrified that he asks the clergy of the saint's house to intercede for him. The clerics travel to Cynan and when they are halted at the River Neath, one of them climbs up a tree to approach the king from up high. The tree bends in such a way that it forms a bridge to the opposite bank of the river and having so witnessed the saint's miraculous powers, Cynan is dissuaded from his violent plans and proclaims peace on all the land. Cynan is here described as a king of Rheinwg, which may be a geographical territory named after Rhain ap Cadwgan in Dyfed, in/near Brycheiniog, or on the border between modern-day Herefordshire and Brecknockshire, most likely in one or both of the former two. In the Welsh life of St Beuno, Cynan is credited for granting land at Gwyddelwern (in Edeirnion) to the saint.

Other sons beside Selyf Sarffgadau include Eiludd, who is sometimes mistaken for Selyf, and unreliable sources add Maredudd and Dinogad to the list. Some genealogies record that he married Gwenwynwyn 'of the Scots'. It is sometimes argued that he died with his son at the Battle of Chester in around 613 but any precise description would be based more on the desire to create a myth of the foundation of a dynasty or legend of Powysian glory than on available evidence.

Preceded by Brochwel Ysgithrog	King of Powys fl. c.550 - c.600	Succeeded by Selyf ap Cynan
