= Mawgan ap Pasgen =

King of Powys

Mawgan ap Pasgen was an ancient king of Powys mentioned in the Harleian genealogies as a son of Pasgen ap Cadeyrn. His name is also spelled Maucann or Maucanu. He appears as Maucannan on the Pillar of Eliseg. A straightforward reading of the genealogies would tend to place his reign in the mid-5th century AD. Ralegh Radford places him much later, in 510–540.

There is a discrepancy in the early Welsh genealogies regarding his descendants. In the Harleian genealogies, he is the father of Cyngen Glodrydd (Cynan, Cincen), father of Brochwel Ysgithrog, but in others Cyngen's father is Cadell Ddyrnllug. In De situ Brecheniauc, Cyngen's father is Cynfor Cadcathug. As Arthur Wade-Evans notes, it is with Mawgan that the Powysian "pedigree begins to be unreliable" – or, in the words of Peter Bartrum, "beyond this point there is confusion". Wade-Evans theorizes that the historical Mawgan was the same person as Saint Ninian and a son of Vortigern. This would put his birth late in the 4th century.

Preceded by Pasgen ap Cadeyrn	King of Powys c. 450?	Succeeded by Brochwel Ysgithrog
