= Cyngen =

Cyngen may refer to:

- Cyngen ap Cadell (d. 855), prince of Powys
- Cyngen Glodrydd, king of Powys
