= Cloten =

Cloten can refer to:

- Cloten of Dyfed and Brycheiniog
- A character in Shakespeare's play Cymbeline
- Cloten (Cornwall) the King of Cornwall
