= Cynllaith =

Welsh medieval commote

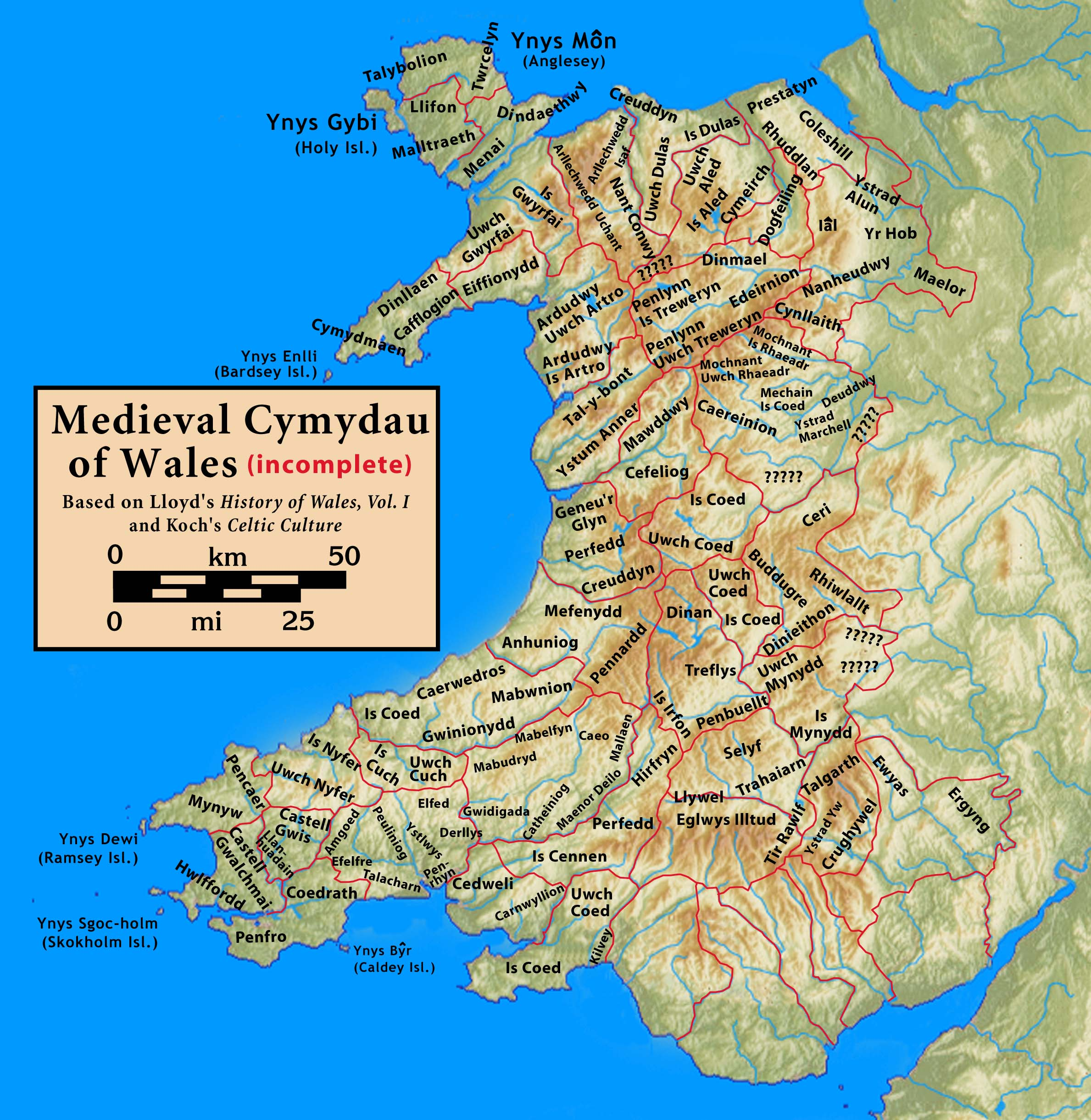
Medieval commotes of Wales

Cynllaith or Cynllaeth was a commote (cwmwd) of north east Wales in the cantref of Swydd y Waun (later Chirkland) which was once part of the Kingdom of Powys and later part of the smaller kingdom of Powys Fadog.

Cynllaith, or at least the part of it called Cynllaith Owain, was part of the inheritance of Owain Glyndŵr in 1370. The titles Baron of Glyndyfrdwy and Lord of Cynllaith Owain were used by the dispossessed former ruling family of Powys Fadog before Owain was proclaimed Prince of Wales in 1400.

The episode "Monk's Hood" of the Cadfael Chronicles includes a scene in a Welsh court in Llansilin within this commote.
