= Beli ab Eiludd =

King of Powys

Beli ab Eiludd was a 7th-century King of Powys.

Some theories assert that he was in fact the son of Manwgan ap Selyf who regained power after Eiludd Powys was killed at the Battle of Maes Cogwy in 642. It is more likely, however, that, as the genealogies state, he was the son of Eiludd who was either the son or brother of Selyf. The former is more likely due to a surviving reference from Cynddelw describing the Mathrafal dynasty as descendants of Selyf. It was also likely, assuming Eiludd Powys fought at Maes Cogwy alongside Elfan Powys and Cynddylan, that Beli would have been the King whom Heledd ran to for protection.

| Preceded by Eiludd Powys | King of Powys; 655–695? | Succeeded by Gwylog ap Beli |
