= Chirkland =

Welsh marcher lordship

Coordinates: 52.931°N 3.056°W

Chirkland (Welsh: Swydd y Waun) was a marcher lordship in north-east Wales. It was created in 1282 from parts of Powys Fadog granted to Roger Mortimer de Chirk, third son of Roger Mortimer, 1st Baron Mortimer of Wigmore, who then built Chirk Castle from where the lordship was administered.

Chirkland continued to be ruled as a separate lordship until the Laws in Wales Acts 1535–1542. After this time, Chirkland became the Hundred of Chirk in the newly created Denbighshire.

Most of the former lordship now lies in the county of Powys.

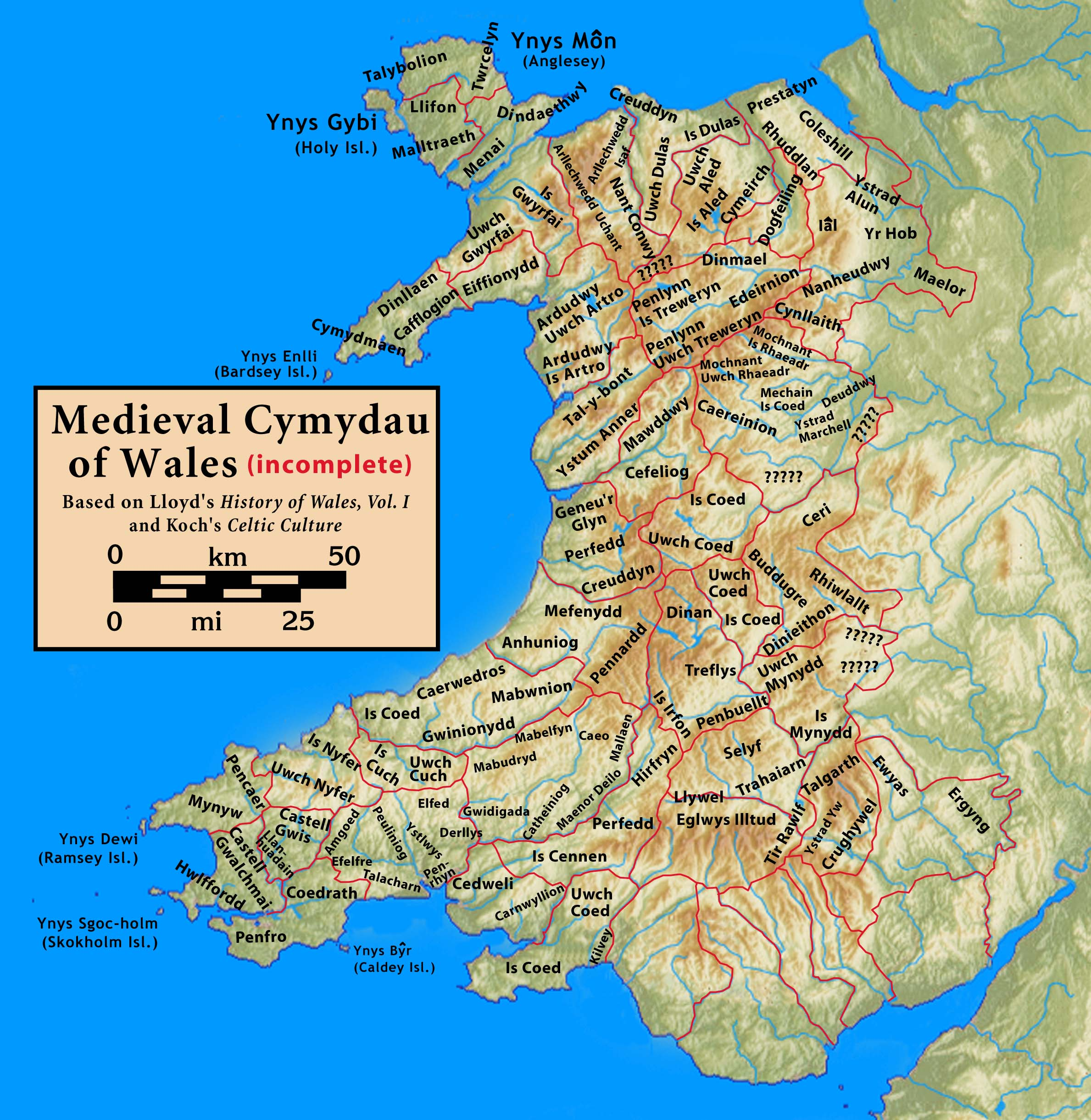
Medieval commotes of Wales (the Swydd y Waun commotes of Cynllaith and Nanheudwy are shown)

Swydd y Waun was the name of a cantref in the medieval Kingdom of Powys. It contained the commotes of Cynllaith and Nanheudwy.
