= Tysilio =

Welsh bishop, prince and scholar

Saint Tysilio
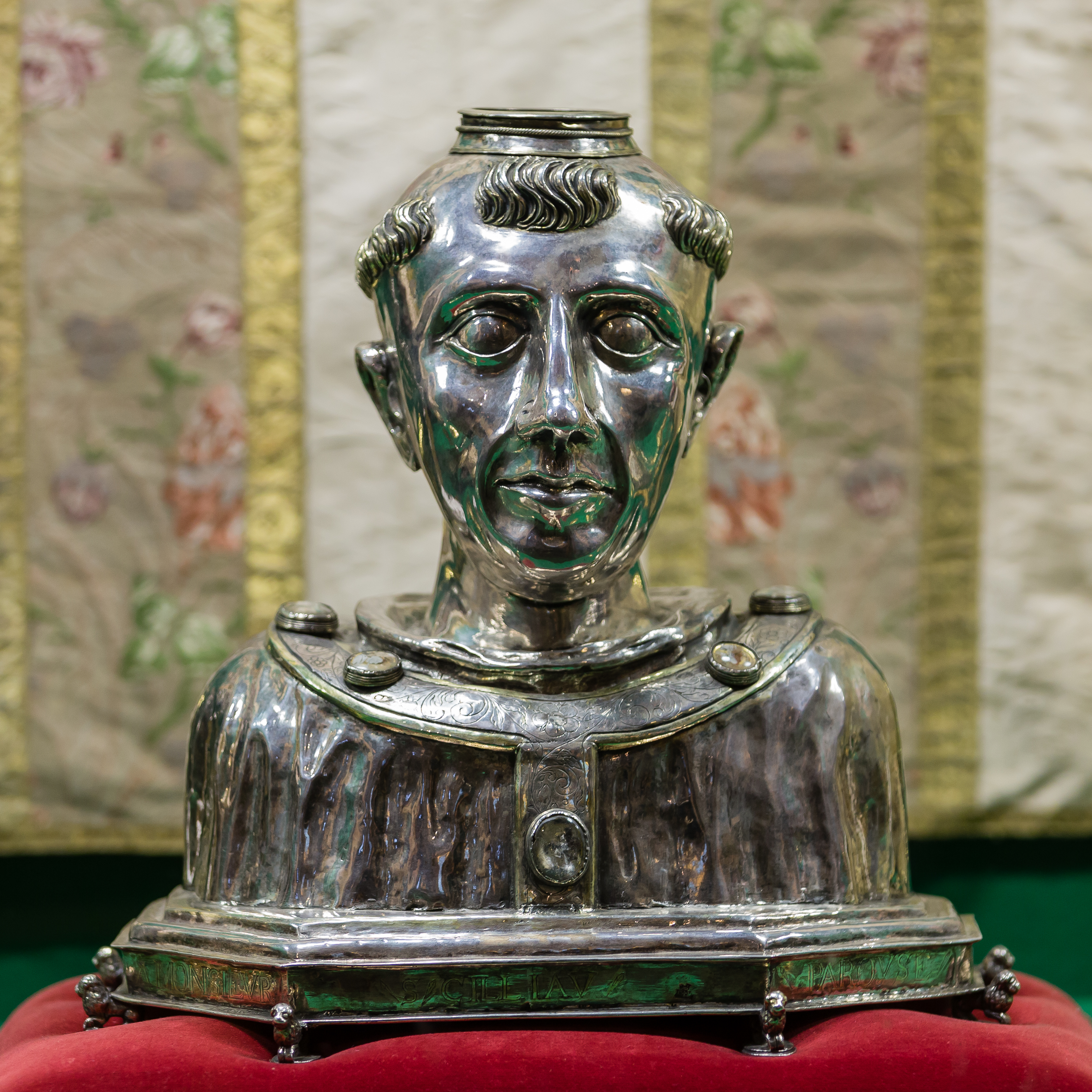
- Reliquary bust of Saint Tysilio in Sizun, Brittany, France.

Bishop
- Born: Late 6th century Powys, Wales
- Died: 640 what is now Saint-Suliac, Brittany
- Venerated in: Anglican Communion; Eastern Orthodox Church; Roman Catholic Church
- Canonized: Pre-congregation
- Major shrine: Fons Tysilio holy well at Guilsfield
- Feast: 8 November

Saint Tysilio (also known as/confused with Saint Suliac; Latin: Tysilius, Suliacus; died 640 AD) was a Welsh bishop, prince and scholar.

== Sources ==
The 12th-century poet Cynddelw Brydydd Mawr wrote "An Ode to Tysilio". There is a genealogy of Tysilio in the Bonedd y Saint, and he is mentioned in the 14th-century vita of Saint Beuno.

Although there is no extent vita of Tysilio, apparently in the 15th century some Breton clerics used details from the life of Tysilio to construct a legenda for their own Saint Suliac. Thus, they indirectly preserved some information regarding Tysilio (and also caused some confusion between the two).

"Suliau" has been used an alternate variation for Tysilio and has sometimes led to his being confused with the Cornish saint Sulien.

== Life ==
Tyslio was the second son of the reigning King of Powys, Brochwel Ysgithrog, and his wife Arddun Penasgell, and the maternal nephew of the great Abbot Dunod of Bangor Iscoed. He took part in the affairs of Wales during the distressful period at the opening of the 7th century.

Tysilio probably started his career in Trallwng Llywelyn (Welshpool) and afterwards took up residence in Meifod where he studied under Gwyddfarch.

Around 630, Tysilio moved to an island in the Menai Strait, (now called Ynys Tysilio, where he established a hermitage, and preached throughout Ynys Môn for the next seven years. He then returned to Meifod, where he talked the aging abbot out of making a pilgrimage to Rome. Eventually, Tysilio succeeded Gwyddfarch as abbot.

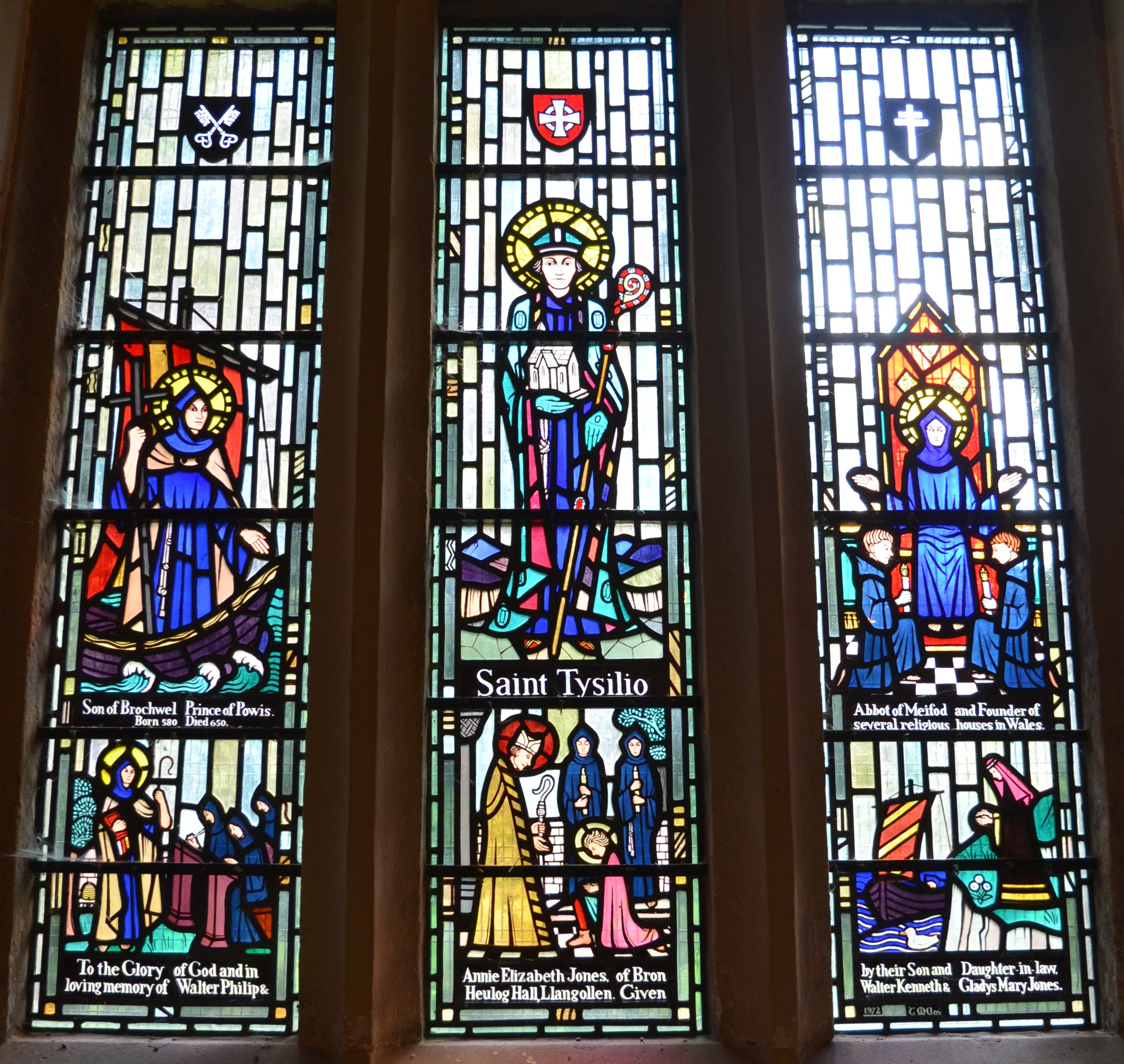
Scenes from Tysilio's life depicted by Trena Cox at St Tysilio's Church, Llantysilio, Denbighshire

King Brochwel, who was fond of hunting, spent his summers in the Vale of Meifod. On his visits to Mathrafal, he often visited the shrine of Saint Gwyddfarch. Brochwel bestowed the bishopric of that part of his kingdom on his son, Tysilio.

He founded the second church in Meifod—the Eglwys Tysilio. His feast day, or gwyl-mabsant, was 8 November which was also the date of the patronal festival and "wakes" in the nearby parish of Guilsfield, where a holy well was dedicated to him—the Fons Tysilio.

Tysilio is traditionally said to be the original author of the Brut Tysilio, a variant of the Welsh chronicle Brut y Brenhinedd, although Brynley F. Roberts has demonstrated that the Brut Tysilio originated around 1500 as an "amalgam" of earlier versions of the Brut y Brenhinedd, which itself derives from Geoffrey of Monmouth's 12th-century Latin Historia Regum Britanniae.

== Place names ==
Today Tysilio's name is remembered in several church and place names in Wales, including Llandysilio in Powys, Llandissilio in Pembrokeshire, Llandysiliogogo in Ceredigion and Llantysilio in Denbighshire with Llantysilio Hall, a Grade II listed building. Across the England-Wales border, in Herefordshire, are the Church of St Tysilio, Sellack, and Llancillo Church.

It appears in the longest place name in the United Kingdom, Llanfairpwllgwyngyllgogerychwyrndrobwllllantysiliogogogoch, part of which (shown bold here) means "the Church of St Tysilio". That name, however, is a late 19th-century invention for the burgeoning tourist industry in the area.

== Bibliography ==
- Roberts, Brynley F. (ed.). Brut y Brenhinedd (Llanstephan MS 1), Brut y Brenhinedd. Llanstephan MS. 1 version. Selections. Mediaeval and Modern Welsh series 5. Dublin, 1971. Extracts and discussion.
- Simpson Jones, T. and Owen, R. (1901), "A History of the Parish of Guilsfield (Cedigva)", Montgomery Collections; 31, 129–200.
