= Nanheudwy =

Welsh medieval commote

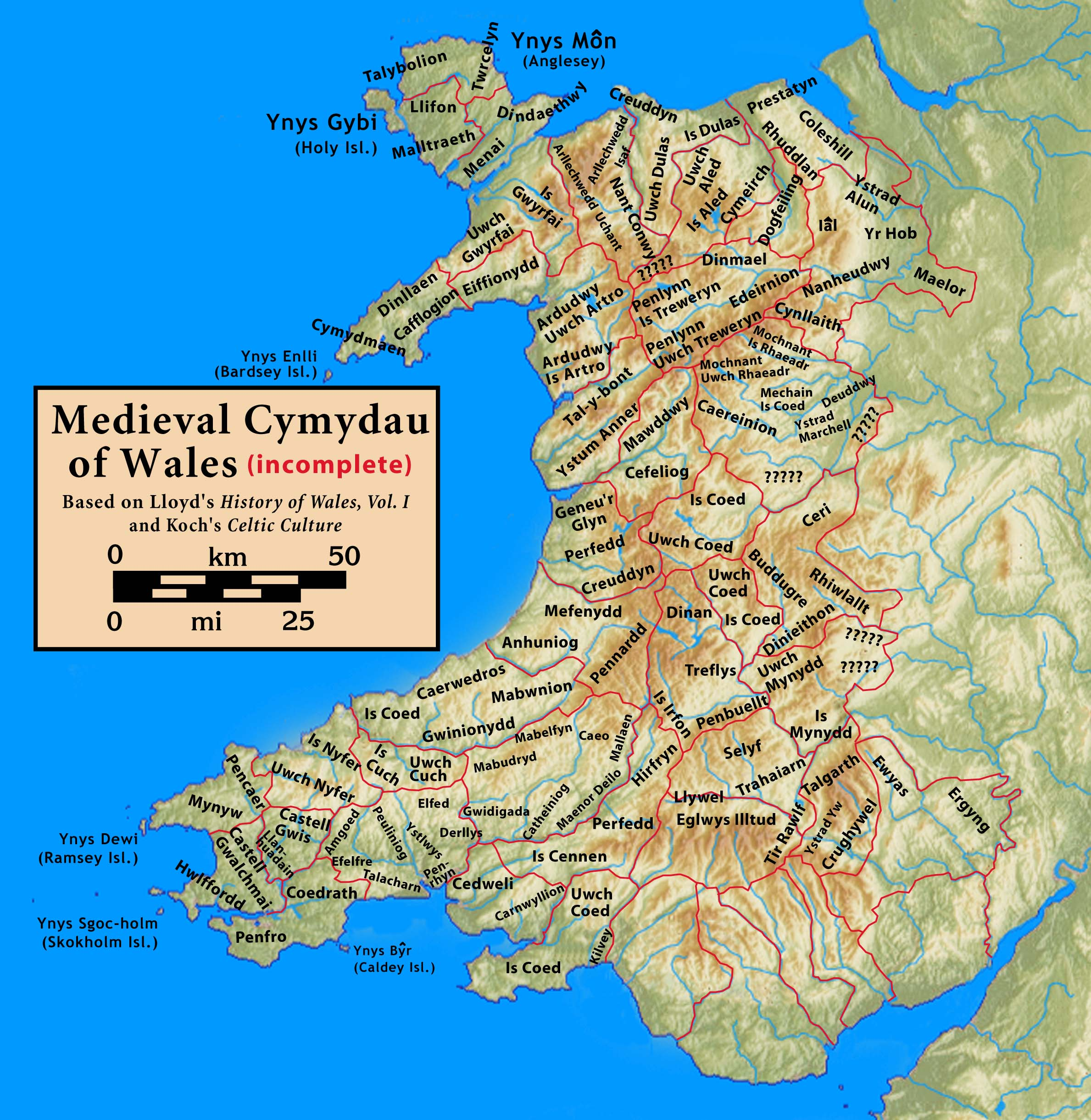
Medieval commotes of Wales

Nanheudwy was a medieval commote of Wales considered part of the ancient Kingdom of Powys in the cantref of Swydd y Waun. It was traditionally defined as the region between the valleys of the rivers Dee and Ceiriog with a mountain ridge running along its length. Its name may be from "Nannau Dwy" meaning "Glens of the Dee".

From 1160 it was a part of the principality of Powys Fadog until the dissolution of that realm in 1277 when it became a marcher lordship. In 1542 it was incorporated into the new administrative county of Denbighshire (historic) that had been constructed based on the English shire model. In 1974 it was transferred to the new county of Clwyd. This arrangement was maintained until 1996 when again it was returned to a reformulated Denbighshire.
