= Eiludd Powys =

King of Powys

Eiludd Powys was an early 7th-century King of Powys.

He is likely to have been the son or younger brother of Selyf "Sarffgadau" ap Cynan Garwyn. It is not known which he was as there are two accounts: one in Jesus College, Oxford MS 20 that makes him the son of Selyf and brother of Manwgan, whereas the one in British Library Harley MS 3859 makes him the brother of Selyf Sarffgadau. Either is plausible, as it is not unheard of that a brother succeeds in absence of a mature heir (see Rhuddfedel Frych), or that the eldest is passed over in the succession (see Gruffudd ap Llywelyn ab Iorwerth and Dafydd ap Llywelyn). There is an interesting reference to the descendants of Selyf, serpents of battle, by the 12th-century Powysian court poet Cynddelw Brydydd Mawr, who, after the dynasty's fall, went to work for the kingdom of Gwynedd and then that of Powys Wenwynwyn.

Preceded by Manwgan ap Selyf	King of Powys; 613 – 642?	Succeeded by Beli ab Eiludd
