= Seisyll =

Seisyll or Seisyllt is a Welsh male given name. It may refer to:

- Kings Sisillius I and II, legendary kings of the Britons
- Seisyll ap Clydog (late 7th century), a king of Ceredigion
- Seisyll ap Rhun (10th century)
- Seisyll ap Ednywain or Owain, father of King Llywelyn of Gwynedd
- Seisyll ap Dyfnwal (12th century), a lord of Upper Gwent
- Seisyll Bryffwrch (12th century), a poet
- Seisyll ap Rhun Fychan (13th century)

== See also ==
- Selyf, a variant of the same name
