= Selyf =

Selyf ("Solomon"; Old Welsh: Seleu) is a Welsh male given name. It may refer to:

- Salomon of Cornwall (5th century), a prince of Cornwall and father of Saint Cybi
- Selyf ap Cynan (called Sarffgadau, "Battle-serpent"), a 7th-century king of Powys killed at the Battle of Chester

== See also ==
- Solomon, known as Selyf in Welsh
- Solomon (name)
