= Soar, Powys =

Coordinates: 51.977263°N 3.499372°W

Soar
- Location within Powys
- OS grid reference: SN 9711 3204
  - Cardiff: 37 mi (60 km)
  - London: 147.8 mi (237.9 km)
- Community: Trallong
- Principal area: Powys
- Country: Wales
- Sovereign state: United Kingdom
- Post town: BRECON
- Postcode district: LD3
- Police: Dyfed-Powys
- Fire: Mid and West Wales
- Ambulance: Welsh
- UK Parliament: Brecon, Radnor and Cwm Tawe
- Senedd Cymru – Welsh Parliament: Brecon and Radnorshire

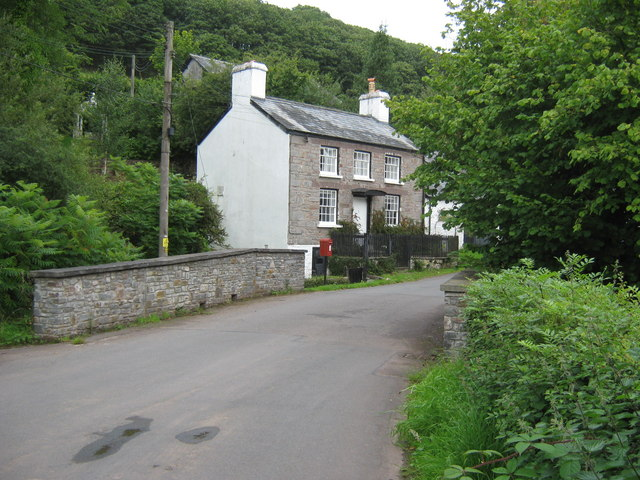
A building in Soar, with the bridge in the foreground

Soar is a small village in Powys, Wales, 37 miles (60 km) North West of Cardiff. It sits at the foot of Mynydd Epynt, and is near Brecon in the historic county of Brecknockshire. The nearby settlement of Ffinnant - divided into the hamlets of Upper Ffinnant (Ffinnant Uchaf Soar) and Lower Ffinnant (Ffinnant Isaf Soar) - may have been the site of the Battle of Ffinnant at which Ithel ap Hywel (king of Gwent) was killed.

The village contains a baptist chapel built in 1827 and rebuilt in 1874.

Soar used to have two tailors, a midwife, a shoemaker, a blacksmith and a preacher but never had a pub.
