= Elisedd ap Tewdwr =

9th-century Welsh king

King of Brycheiniog
- Reign: 9th century
- Successor: Tewdwr ap Elisedd
- Issue: Tewdwr ap Elisedd

Elisedd ap Tewdwr (also known as Elisse) was King of Brycheiniog (modern Brecknockshire, Wales) in the 9th-century.

A contemporary of Alfred the Great, he served as vassal to the king during the viking raids of the 880s following the allying of Anarawd ap Rhodri, King of Brycheiniog's adversary Gwynedd, with the Danish kingdom of York in 881.

During Elisedd's reign, the only known crannog in Wales, Llangorse Lake Crannog, was built at the centre of Brycheiniog's territory in Llangorse starting about 889.

Elisedd was the grandson of Gruffudd ap Nowy. By 916, he had died and his son Tewdwr ap Elisedd was on the throne.

Preceded by	King of Brycheiniog	Succeeded by Tewdwr ap Elisedd
