= History of Hampshire =

History of the English county

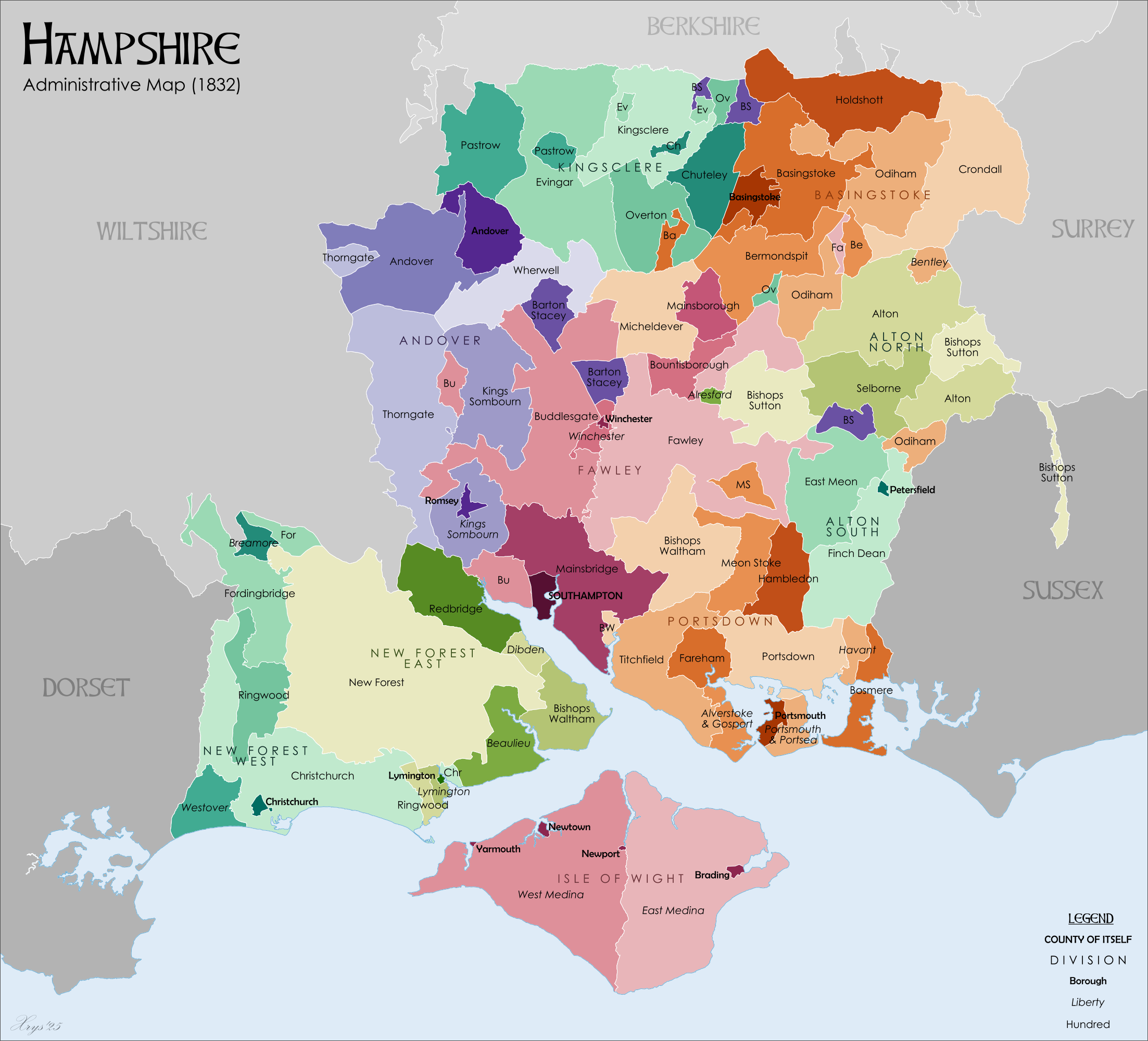
Hampshire in 1832

Hampshire is a county in Southern England with some notable archaeology and many notable historic buildings.

The chalk downland of the South Downs and southern edges of Salisbury Plain were settled in the Neolithic, and these settlers built hill forts such as Winklebury and may have farmed the valleys of Hampshire. Hampshire was part of an Ancient British kingdom the Celts called Gwent (not be confused with the county in Wales) or Y Went, describing the county's open downs, which also covered areas that would later belong to Somerset and Wiltshire. In the Roman invasion of Britain, Hampshire was one of the first areas to fall to the invading forces.

During the period of Anglo-Saxon settlement, modern Hampshire and the Isle of Wight were occupied by Jutish tribes – a people separate initially from the Saxons and Angles. Jutes founded kingdoms known as Wihtwara (Wight), Meonwara (Meon Valley) and Ytene (in an area similar to the later site of the New Forest). According to St Bede, however, the Jutes were conquered by the surrounding Saxon kingdoms during the 7th century. Hamtunscīr (after Hamtun, the original name of Southampton) was one of the first Saxon shires to be recorded, in 755.

For two centuries Hampshire represented the western frontier of Saxon England, as the Britons fought off advances into Dorset and Somerset. After the Saxons advanced west Hampshire became the centre of the Kingdom of Wessex, and many Saxon kings are buried at Winchester. A statue in Winchester celebrates the powerful King Alfred, who stabilised the region in the 9th century.

After the Norman Conquest the county was favoured by Norman kings who established the New Forest as a hunting forest. The county was recorded in the Domesday Book divided into 44 hundreds. These later consolidated to 37. These were Alton, Andover, Barmanstip, Barton Stacey, Basingstoke, Bedbridge, Bondsborough, Bosmere, Buddlesgate, Christchurch, Chutely, Crondall, East Meon, Evinger, Fawley, Finchdean, Fordingbridge, Hambledon, Heling, Holdsett, King's Somborne, Kingsclere, Mansbridge, Meanstoke, Micheldever, New Forest, Odiham, Overton, Pastrow, Portsdown, Ringwood, Shelbourn, Sutton, Thorngate, Titchfield, Waltham and Wherwell.

Over several centuries a series of castles and forts were constructed along the coast of the Solent to defend the harbours at Southampton and Portsmouth. These include the Norman Portchester Castle which overlooks Portsmouth Harbour, and a series of forts built by Henry VIII including Hurst Castle, situated on a sand spit at the mouth of the Solent, Calshot Castle on another spit at the mouth of Southampton Water, and Netley Castle. Southampton and Portsmouth remained important harbours when rivals, such as Poole and Bristol declined, as they are amongst the few locations that combine shelter with deep water. Southampton has been host to many famous ships, including the Mayflower and the Titanic, the latter being crewed largely by Hampshire natives.

Hampshire played a large role in World War II due to its large Royal Navy harbour at Portsmouth, the army camp at Aldershot and the military Netley Hospital on Southampton Water, as well as its proximity to the army training ranges on Salisbury Plain and the Isle of Purbeck. Supermarine, the designers of the Spitfire and other military aircraft, were based in Southampton, which led to severe bombing of the city. Aldershot remains one of the British Army's main permanent camps.

The county has in the past been called "Southamptonshire" and appears as such on some Victorian maps. The name of the administrative county was changed from 'County of Southampton' to 'County of Hampshire' on 1 April 1959. The short form of the name, often used in postal addresses, is Hants.

The old name appears as the place of embarkation of many of the immigrants into Ellis Island. It is recorded in the Commonwealth Instrument of Government, 1653, which was adopted by Oliver Cromwell when he assumed the office of Lord Protector in 1654.

The Isle of Wight has been for some purposes in the past treated traditionally part of Hampshire, but has been administered separately from Hampshire for over a century, obtaining a county council of its own in 1890. The Isle of Wight became a full ceremonial county in 1974. The island is excluded from the hundreds given above – it was traditionally divided into East Medina and West Medina hundreds. Apart from a shared police force there are now no formal administrative links between the Isle of Wight and Hampshire.

The towns of Bournemouth and Christchurch also fall within the historic county of Hampshire.

== See also ==
- History of England

== Sources ==
- Encyclopædia Britannica, 1911. "Hampshire".
- Victoria County History of Hampshire: the local history of the county, organised by parish. Four volumes; part of British History Online.
