= Gwyddfarch =

English Roman Catholic saint

Gwyddfarch was a hermit and founder of a Celtic abbey at Meifod in Wales.

He was a son of Amalarus and disciple of Saint Llywelyn at Welshpool. About 550 AD he founded a monastery at Meifod. This establishment became the mother church of several other monasteries and was a centre of the order for over one thousand years, and within a generation the monastery had become a centre of pilgrimage.

Gwyddfarch taught Tysilio, who replaced him as abbot.

Legend holds that near the end of his life Tysilio talked the aging abbot out of a pilgrimage to Rome. He died about the year 610.

He is commemorated on 3 November.
