= Catigern =

King

Catigern (Welsh: Cadeyrn) is a figure of Welsh tradition, said to be a son of Vortigern, the tyrannical King of the Britons, and the brother of Vortimer. A figure of this name also appears in the Welsh genealogies, though he is given different parentage. Catigern is nearly exclusively known for a tradition in which he fell in battle with the Saxons.

== Etymology ==
The Old Welsh personal name Catigirn (≈ Cattegirn) means 'Battle-Prince'. It stems from a Common Brittonic form reconstructed as *katu-tigernos, formed with the root *katu- ('combat'; cf. Gaul. catu- 'combat, battle', OIr. cath 'battle, troop') attached to tigernos ('lord, master'; cf. Gaul. tigerno-, Olr. tigern, OW. tegyrned, OBret. Tigern). The name Catiherno, borne by a Breton priest c. 509–521, may also be related.

Catigern is sometimes given the epithet Fendigaid ('the Blessed'), albeit erroneously; historical genealogies list him solely as Catigern, as do historians such as Bartrum. The appearance of this epithet may have arisen due to confusion with Catigern's brother, Vortimer, who is also recorded as Gwerthefyr Fendigaid.

== History ==
The earliest mention of Catigern appears in the Historia Brittonum, written in the 9th century and attributed to the monk Nennius. Chapters 43–45 say that the British king Vortigern had been appeasing the Saxons, and his son Vortimer rose against the enemy and engaged them in four battles. At the third of these, the Battle of Epsford (Aylesford), Catigern fell, as did the Saxon leader Horsa. Chapter 48 also mentions Catigern as Vortigern's second son after Vortimer and before Pascent and Faustus, and reiterates that he died in the same battle as Horsa. Neither mention is clear as to which side Catigern was on, but context implies he fought alongside his brother against the Saxons. The Anglo-Saxon Chronicle describes this battle and the death of Horsa in the entry for 455, though it does not mention Catigern.

A Catigern, here Cattegirn (Celtic cato- "battle", tigerno- "lord"), also appears in the Harleian genealogies. This Cattegirn is included towards the head of three of the pedigrees of rulers of Powys. In each of these, however, he is said to be the son not of Vortigern, but of the legendary Powys ancestor figure Cadell Ddyrnllwg. This Cadell is known from the Historia Brittonum, which says he was a servant of King Benlli who had been blessed by Vortigern's enemy Saint Germanus of Auxerre, and thereafter became a king whose descendants ruled Powys through the centuries. However, one of the genealogies from Jesus College MS 20 refers to a "Cadern", father of Cadell and the son of Vortigern.

== Later literature and legend ==
Catigern appears briefly in Geoffrey of Monmouth's pseudohistorical chronicle Historia Regum Britanniae, in a section adapted from the Historia Brittonum account. Geoffrey adds the detail that Catigern and Horsa personally met in battle at Epsford and slew each other. Geoffrey's account spread widely through the Middle Ages and after, and Catigern has appeared in adaptations of Geoffrey, and occasionally, in other derivative works. His battle with Horsa is the subject of John Lesslie Hall's poem "The Death of Horsa", and he appears as a minor character in William Henry Ireland's play Vortigern and Rowena, which was initially touted as a lost work by William Shakespeare.

The Neolithic chamber tomb of Kit's Coty House, located near Aylesford, is identified with Catigern's tomb in local legend.

Preceded by Vortigern	King of Powys; 430 – 447	Succeeded by Cadell Ddyrnllwg
