= Rhuddfedel Frych =

King of Powys, Wales

Rhuddfedel Frych ('Rhuddfedel the Freckled') may have been a late 5th-century Welsh ruler. At least one historian has suggested that he may have been the first member of the royal house of Powys to be styled as "Prince".

Peter Bartrum notes that Rhuddfedel appears only in a "very artificial pedigree of Cadell Ddyrnllug" in the Hanesyn Hen and that "Nothing is known about Rhuddfedel Frych. He may perhaps be a son of Cateyrn."

Rhuddfedel was said to have been succeeded by his son Cyngen Glodrydd.
