= Cloten of Dyfed and Brycheiniog =

7th-century Welsh king

Cloten was the king of Dyfed and Brycheiniog in Southern Wales in the 7th century.

Already the king of Dyfed, he married Queen Ceindrych of Brycheiniog c. 650, briefly uniting the two kingdoms; they would be divided again after his son's reign.

Preceded by Nowy Hen	King of Dyfed	Succeeded by Rhain of Dyfed and Brycheiniog
Preceded by Rhiwallon	King of Brycheiniog	Succeeded by Rhain of Dyfed and Brycheiniog
