= Brochfael Ysgithrog =

6th-century Welsh king

Brochfael Ysgithrog ap Cyngen

King of Powys
- Reign: c. 540–c. 560
- Predecessor: Cyngen Glodrydd
- Successor: Cynan Garwyn
- Died: 560
- Spouse: Ardun Benn Ascell
- Issue: Cynan Garwyn, Saint Tysilio
- Father: Cyngen Glodrydd
- Mother: Tudglid ferch Brychan (daughter of Brychan ap Gwyngwen ap Tewdr)

The traditional arms of Brochfael Ysgithrog

Brochfael Ysgithrog ap Cyngen (died c. 560), was a king of Powys in eastern Wales. The unusual epithet Ysgithrog has been translated as "of the canine teeth", "the fanged" or "of the tusk" (perhaps because of big teeth, horns on a helmet or, most likely, his aggressive manner).

== Family ==
Brochfael was the son of King Cyngen Glodrydd and his wife Tudglid ferch Brychan, a daughter of Brychan ap Gwyngwen ap Tewdr. As far as is known, Brochfael married Arddyn Benasgel, sometimes written Arddun Penasgell (Wing Headed), daughter of King Pabo Post Prydain. They were the parents of King Cynan Garwyn and Saint Tysilio, the founder of the old church at Meifod.

Preceded by Cyngen Glodrydd	King of Powys c. 540 – c. 560	Succeeded by Cynan Garwyn
