= Ceindrych ferch Rhiwallon =

7th century queen regnant of Brycheiniog in southern Wales

Ceindrych ferch Rhiwallon was the queen regnant of Brycheiniog in Southern Wales in the 7th century, c. 650–670.

She was the daughter of Rhiwallon ap Idwallon, king of Brycheiniog.

She first married her cousin prince Elisedd ap Ysgorda in an attempt to keep the dynasty in the family, but the marriage was a short one. She remarried her more distant relative, king Cloten of Dyfed and Brycheiniog c. 650. The marriage briefly united the two kingdoms under their son; they would be divided again after his son's reign.

In this time period, many of the rulers of the Welsh petty kingdoms are not confirmed as historic. Queen Ceindrych is however documented until at least so far back as the 11th-century and are believed to have been historic.
