= Cyngen Glodrydd =

King of Powys in Wales

Cyngen Glodrydd was a semi-legendary early sixth-century King of Powys.

Cyngen was a descendant of Cadell Ddyrnllwg, probably his son. Cyngen married Tudglid ferch Brychan, resulting in a large family: Brochwel Ysgithrog, Cadell, Ieuaf, Maig Myngfras, Mawn and Sanan.

What was once thought his memorial stone was discovered being used as a gatepost in Tywyn in 1761, indicating he was apparently buried with Saint Cadfan in the local churchyard. More recent research has suggested the so-called Cadfan Stone is of much later date, perhaps the eighth or ninth century, and does not commemorate Cyngen or Cadfan at all.

Preceded by Mawgan ap Pasgen	King of Powys c. 510 – c. 540	Succeeded by Brochwel Ysgithrog

Preceded by Cadell Ddyrnllwg? or Rhuddfedel Frych?	King of Powys c. 500	Succeeded by Brochwel Ysgithrog
