= Manwgan ap Selyf =

King of Powys

Manwgan ap Selyf was an early 7th-century King of Powys, the son of Selyf Sarffgadau.

One theory asserts that when Manwgan ap Selyf came to the throne in 613 he was a young boy, which led to an invasion of Powys by Eluadd ap Glast (alias Eiludd Powys), the erstwhile King of Dogfeiling. The usurper probably managed to hold the throne for some thirty years or more before he was killed fighting the Northumbrians, possibly at the Battle of Maes Cogwy, traditionally identified as Oswestry, in 642. The Dogfeiling dynasty was finally crushed by the Saxons around 656, and Manwgan was able to take his rightful place on the Powysian throne. However Eiludd is unlikely to be the same as Eluadd ap Glast as Eiludd is recorded as the brother of Manwgan and son of Selyf in Jesus College, Oxford MS. 20, whereas in the British Library Harley MS 3859 he is Manwgan's uncle and a brother of Selyf.

Preceded by Selyf Sarffgadau	King of Powys; 613, 642?-655?	Succeeded by Eiludd Powys
