= Benlli =

British king

King Benlli (Welsh: Benlli Gawr) was a probably legendary Brythonic king who ruled part of what is now Wales in the early fifth century, traditionally Powys. He is theorized to have been of, possibly, Irish ancestry.

== Recognition ==
Benlli was notorious in early Welsh sources for opposing Saint Germanus and—if he existed—may have been a follower of Pelagianism and thus a heretic in the eyes of Germanus and the Catholic Church. The story of his admonishment by the saint and eventual demise by "fire from heaven" is recorded in the ninth century Historia Brittonum attributed to Nennius, chapters 32-35. Also according to the Historia he was succeeded by Cadell Ddyrnllwg, formerly one of his servants, who had given shelter to Germanus and his party after Benlli refused to admit them to his stronghold. The hill fort at Foel Fenlli is traditionally considered to have been his castle.
