= Selyf ap Cynan =

7th-century king of Powys

Selyf ap Cynan or Selyf Sarffgadau (died 616) appears in Old Welsh genealogies as an early 7th-century King of Powys, the son of Cynan Garwyn.

His name is a Welsh form of Solomon, appearing in the oldest genealogies as Selim. He reputedly bore the nickname Sarffgadau, meaning battle-serpent. According to the Annals of Ulster and the Annales Cambriae, in 616 he died at the Battle of Chester, fighting against Æthelfrith of Northumbria. The Annals of Ulster entitle him King of the Britons, perhaps because he led a combined force from more than one Brythonic kingdom at that battle against the Northumbrians. In Jesus College MS 18, Selyf is identified as father of Beli and subsequently ancestor of the later kings of Powys; in other genealogies, he is father of an Eiludd ap Selyf, and in another, he is identified as grandfather of a Beli ap Mael Myngan ap Selyf. Breneu Powys, or the Privileges of Powys, by Cynddelw Brydydd Mawr, the court poet of the major Kingdoms of Wales at the time, refers to Selyf's descendants as serpents of battle, most likely in reference to the Mathrafal dynasty, which ruled Powys at the time. This suggests that Eiludd, who is most commonly identified as progenitor of the continuation of the House of Gwerthrynion, was likely to have been a son of Selyf.

Preceded by Cynan Garwyn	King of Powys ?– 616	Succeeded by Manwgan ap Selyf
