= Mathrafal =

Fortification in Powys, Wales

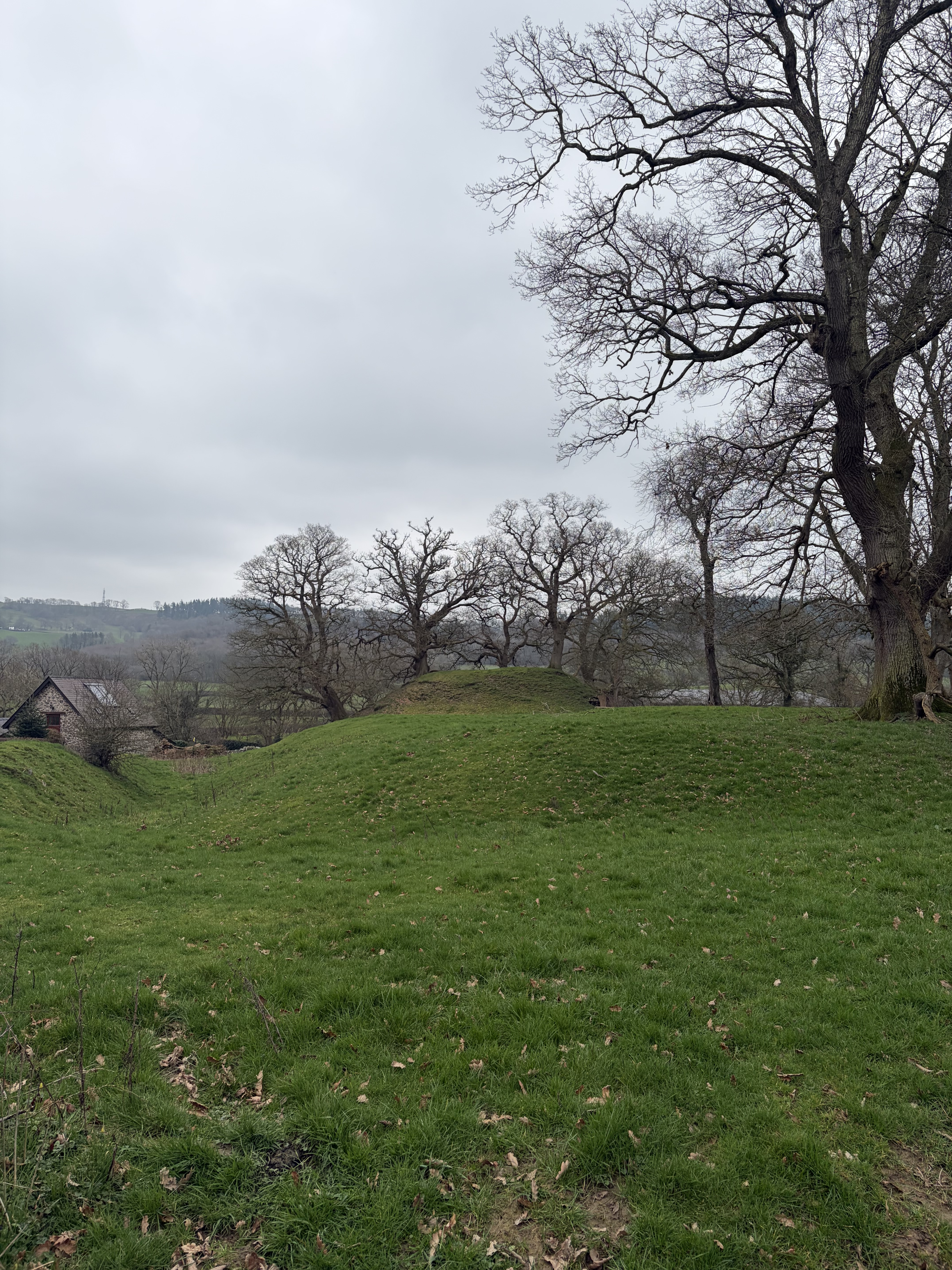
- The site in 2026, viewed from the north

- Mathrafal within Wales
- 52°41′17″N 3°17′15″W
- Type: Motte and Bailey Castle
- Periods: Medieval
- Associated with: Bleddyn ap Cynfyn Maredudd ap Bleddyn; Madog ap Maredudd; Owain Cyfeiliog Gwenwynwyn
- Location: Near Welshpool
- Region: Powys, Wales
- Part of: Capital of the Kingdom of Powys until 1160, then of Powys Wenwynwyn until 1212.

History
- Built: 9th century
- Abandoned: 1212

Site notes
- Length: 90 m (300 ft)
- Width: 80 m (260 ft)
- Excavation dates: 1991
- Archaeologists: University of York
- Condition: Ruin - mainly earthworks remaining

Mathrafal near Welshpool, in Powys, Mid Wales, was the seat of the Kings and Princes of Powys probably from the 9th century until its destruction in 1213 by Prince Llywelyn the Great.

== Location ==
On the banks of the River Banwy, just above its confluence with the river Vyrnwy, about 5 km (3 miles) NE of Llanfair Caereinion and 10 km (6 miles) NW of Welshpool on the A495 at its junction with the B4389.

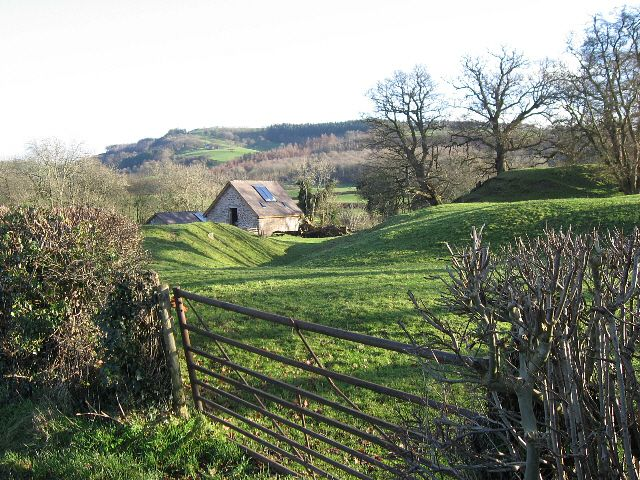
Entry to the earthworks and view towards the motte

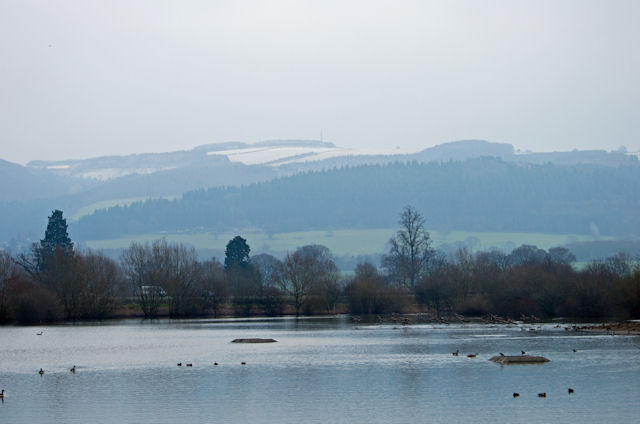
Mathrafal area, near Welshpool, Powys

== Description ==
The site known today as "Mathrafal Castle" is a 90 m by 80 m compound defended by a bank and outer ditch on three sides, the fourth side being the river. Little remains of the original walls.

Mathrafal is the original capital of the Kingdom of Powys, in the cantref of Caereinion. After the division of Powys in 1160 it became the capital of the southern portion which eventually became known as Powys Wenwynwyn.

The 35m by 25m by 5m high motte of Mathrafal Castle dates from around the end of the 12th century and was probably built either by Owain Cyfeiliog (circa 1170) or Robert de Vieuxpont on behalf of King John in 1212. Prince Gwenwynwyn ab Owain of Powys moved his capital from Mathrafal to Welshpool (Y Trallwng) in 1212. Later in 1212, Robert de Vieuxpont was besieged in the castle by the coalition forces of Gwenwynwyn and Llywelyn the Great, he was rescued by King John. The castle was destroyed and never rebuilt.

Excavations by the University of York around 1991 found an iron and bronze figurine of St Gwynllyw (or Woolos the Warrior) in a cavity in a window base.
