= Kingdom of Powys =

400s–1160 kingdom in east-central Wales

Coordinates: 53°14′N 4°1′W

Kingdom of Powys Teyrnas Powys
- c. 5th century? – before 886 c. 1124 – 1160
- Arms of the lords of Southern Powys, later used by John Charlton, baron of Powys Coat of arms

- The borders of the region of Powys in c. 1201
- Capital: None
- Common languages: Old Welsh, Middle Welsh, Latin
- Religion: Roman Catholicism
- Government: Monarchy
  - c. 6th century: Cynan Garwyn
  - d. 616: Selyf ap Cynan
  - d. 855: Cyngen ap Cadell
  - c. 1124 – 1132: Maredudd ap Bleddyn
  - 1132–1160: Madog ap Maredudd
- Historical era: Middle Ages
  - Battle of Chester: 613
  - First attestation of the name: 828
  - Erection of the Pillar of Eliseg: c. 850
  - Conquest of Powys by the Second Dynasty of Gwynedd: before 886
  - Reestablishment of Powys by Maredudd ap Bleddyn: c. 1124
  - Reign of Madog ap Maredudd: 1132 – 10 February 1160
  - Killing of Llywelyn ap Madog, division between Northern and Southern Powys: 1160
- Currency: ceiniog
Preceded by	Succeeded by
sub-Roman Britain	Powys Wenwynwyn; Powys Fadog

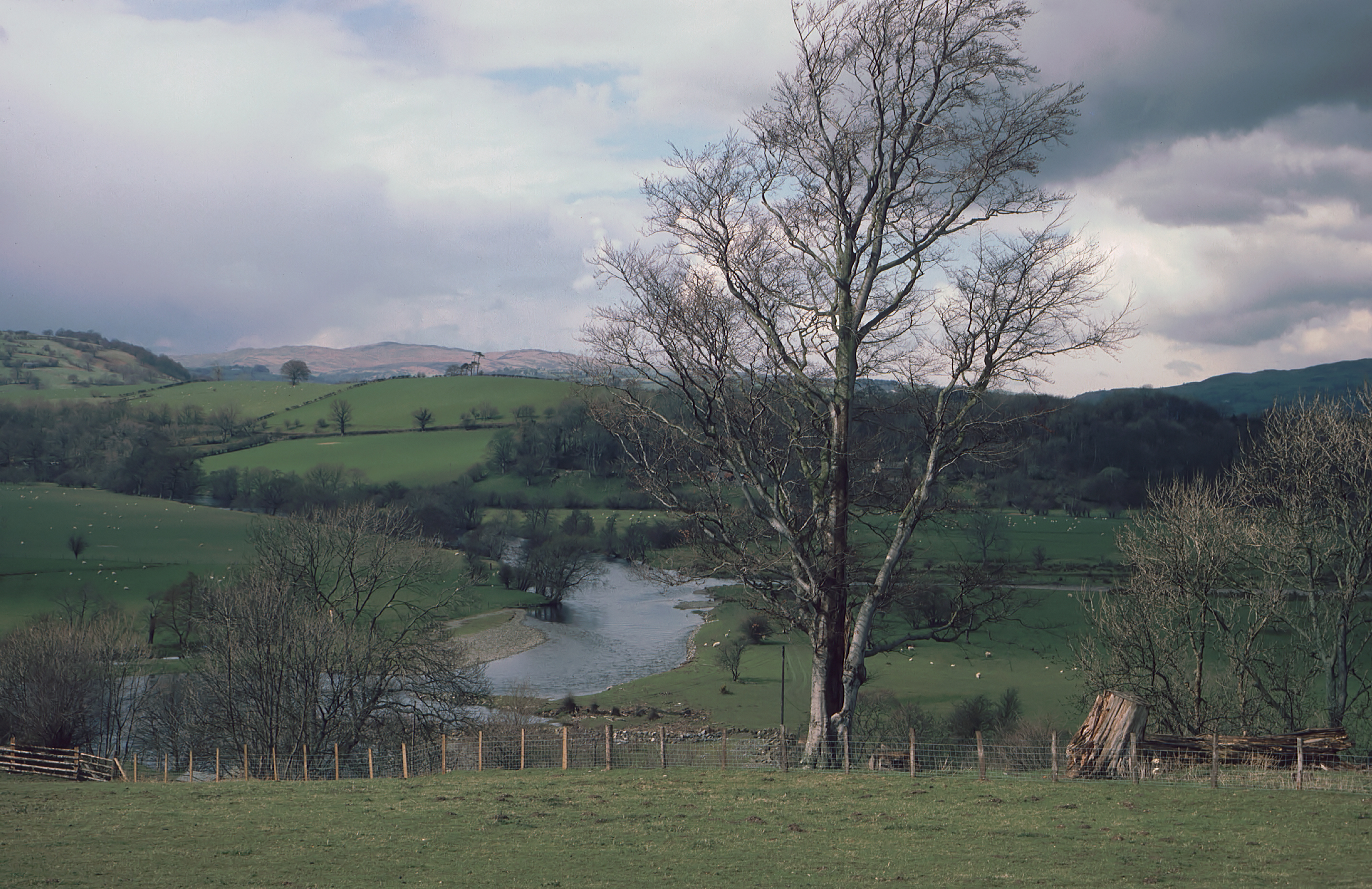
Powys landscape near Foel

The Kingdom of Powys (Welsh pronunciation: [ˈpowɪs]; Latin: Regnum Poysiae) was a Welsh successor state, petty kingdom and principality that emerged during the Middle Ages following the end of Roman rule in Britain. It very roughly covered the northern two-thirds of the modern county of Powys and part of today's English West Midlands (see map). More precisely, and based on the Romano-British tribal lands of the Ordovices in the west and the Cornovii in the east, its boundaries originally extended from the Cambrian Mountains in the west to include the modern West Midlands region of England in the east. The fertile river valleys of the Severn and Tern are found there, and this region is referred to in later Welsh literature as "the Paradise of Powys" (an epithet retained in Welsh for the modern UK county).

== Name ==
The name Powys is thought to derive from Latin pagus 'the countryside' and pagenses 'dwellers in the countryside', also the origins of French "pays" and English "peasant". During the Roman Empire, this region was organised into a province, with the capital at Viroconium Cornoviorum (modern Wroxeter), the fourth-largest Roman city in Britain. It was later abandoned for Deva Victrix (Chester).

The term Teyrnllwg was stated as an older name of Powys in the 1851 Archaeologia Cambrensis, and said to also be used in the medieval Brut y Tywysogion. However, it is likely that the term referred to an "imaginary territory" traced back to the work of known hoaxer Iolo Morganwg. The term is incorrectly derived from deyrnllwg, a newer form of the cognomen durnluc (modern ddyrnllug), used by Cadell Ddyrnllwg (Catel Durnluc). Aside being claimed for Powys, it was also used to refer to areas of Cheshire and south Lancashire. This term was also translated and used to refer to only Vale Royal (in modern Cheshire), which Powys would have bordered.

== Early Middle Ages ==
Throughout the Early Middle Ages, Powys was ruled by the Gwrtheyrnion dynasty, a family claiming descent jointly from the marriage of Vortigern and Princess Sevira, the daughter of Magnus Maximus. Archaeological evidence has shown that, unusually for the post-Roman period, Viroconium Cornoviorum survived as an urban centre well into the 6th century and thus could have been the Powys capital. The 'Pagenses' may have initially been a peripheral group who took control of the former territory of the Cornovii after the collapse of Roman Rule. The Historia Brittonum, written around AD 828, records the town as Caer Guricon, one of his "28 British Towns" of Roman Britain. In the following centuries, the Powys eastern border was encroached upon by English settlers from the emerging Anglian territory of Mercia. This was a gradual process, and English control in the West Midlands was uncertain until the late 8th century.

In 549, the Plague of Justinian – an outbreak of a strain of bubonic plague – arrived in Britain, and Welsh communities were devastated, with villages and countryside alike depopulated. However, the English were less affected by this plague as they had far fewer trading contacts with the continent at this time. Faced with shrinking manpower and increasing Anglian encroachment, King Brochwel Ysgithrog may have moved the court from Caer Guricon to Pengwern, the exact site of which is unknown but may have been at Shrewsbury, traditionally associated with Pengwern, or the more defensible Din Gwrygon, the hill fort on The Wrekin.

In 616, the armies of King Æthelfrith of Northumbria clashed with Powys. Seeing an opportunity to further drive a wedge between the North Welsh and those of Rheged, Æthelfrith invaded Powys's northern lands. Æthelfrith forced a battle near Chester and defeated Selyf and his allies. At the commencement of the battle, Bede tells us that the pagan Æthelfrith slaughtered 1,200 monks from the important monastery of Bangor-on-Dee in Maelor because, he said, "they fight against us, because they oppose us by their prayers". Selyf ap Cynan was also killed in the battle and may have been the first of the kings of Powys to be buried at the church dedicated to St. Tysilio, at Meifod, thence known as the Eglwys Tysilio and subsequently the dynasty's Royal mausoleum.

If King Cynddylan of Pengwern hailed from the royal Powys dynasty, then forces from Powys may also have been present at the Battle of Maes Cogwy in 642. According to the probably ninth-century cycle of englyn-poems Canu Heledd, the region around Pengwern was sacked soon after, its royal family slaughtered and most of its lands were annexed by Mercia, some by Powys. However, this account is generally now thought to represent ninth-century imaginings of what must have been going on in the seventh, inspired by Powys's political situation in the ninth century.

Powys enjoyed a resurgence with successful campaigns against the English in 655, 705–707 and 722, wrote Davies. The court was moved to Mathrafal Castle in the valley of the river Vyrnwy by 717, possibly by King Elisedd ap Gwylog (d.c. 755). Elisedd's successes led King Æthelbald of Mercia to build Wat's Dyke. This endeavour may have been with Elisedd's own agreement, however, for this boundary, extending north from the Severn Valley to the Dee estuary, gave Oswestry (Welsh: Croesoswallt) to Powys. King Offa of Mercia seems to have continued this consultive initiative when he created a larger earth work, now known as Offa's Dyke (Welsh: Clawdd Offa). Davies wrote of Cyril Fox's study of Offa's Dyke, "In the planning of it, there was a degree of consultation with the kings of Powys and Gwent.

On the Long Mountain near Trelystan, the dyke veers to the east, leaving the fertile slopes in the hands of the Welsh; near Rhiwabon, it was designed to ensure that Cadell ap Brochwel retained possession of the Fortress of Penygadden." And for Gwent Offa had the dyke built "on the eastern crest of the gorge, clearly with the intention of recognizing that the river Wye and its traffic belonged to the kingdom of Gwent." This new border moved Oswestry back to the English side of the new frontier, and Offa attacked Powys in 760 at Hereford, and again in 778, 784 and 796. Offa's Dyke largely remained the frontier between the Welsh and English, though the Welsh would recover by the 12th century the area between the Dee and the River Conwy, known then as the Perfeddwlad or "Midlands".

== Rhodri, Hywel, and Gruffydd ==
Powys was united with Gwynedd when king Merfyn Frych of the Gwynedd dynasty married princess Nest ferch Cadell, daughter of king Cyngen of Powys, the last representative of the Gwertherion dynasty. With the death of Cyngen in 854 Rhodri Mawr became king of Powys, having inherited Gwynedd the year before. This formed the basis of Gwynedd's continued claims of overlordship over Powys for the next 443 years.

Rhodri Mawr (Rhodri the Great) ruled over most of modern Wales until his death in 878. His sons would in turn found dynasties of their own which would loom large in Welsh history, each claiming descent from Rhodri. Merfyn inherited Powys, whilst his brothers, Anarawd ap Rhodri and Cadell, established the Aberffraw dynasty in Gwynedd and the line of Dinefwr respectively.

In 942 Hywel Dda of Deheubarth (Rhodri's grandson through his second son, Cadell) seized Gwynedd on the death of his cousin, Idwal Foel. He apparently took Powys from Llywelyn ap Merfyn at the same time and arranged for a dynastic marriage between their children. Hywel had founded Deheubarth in 920 out of his maternal and paternal inheritances and maintained close relations with Æthelstan, King of the Anglo-Saxons, often visiting Æthelstan's court. Hywel studied the English legal system and reformed Welsh law in his own realms (later called the Cyfraith Hywel or "laws of Hywel"), and when he went on pilgrimage to Rome in 928, he took his collection of laws, which allegedly were blessed by the pope.

Hywel encouraged the use of coinage in Wales, having his monies minted in Chester, a benefit of his relations with England. In 945 Hywel held an assembly in Whitland to codify his law codes, though with the aid of the celebrated cleric Blegywryd. Hwyel's works would lead posterity to name him the good (Welsh: Hywel Dda), and his reign is recognised as an unusually peaceful one. On his death, Gwynedd reverted to the Aberffraw dynasty, though Powys and Deheubarth were divided between his sons.

Maredudd ab Owain rebuilt the kingdom of his grandfather Hywel Dda. He was king of Deheubarth and Powys by 986, when he seized Gwynedd. Maredudd fought off English encroachment in Powys and increasing Viking raids in Gwynedd. He is recorded to have paid a penny for hostages captured by Vikings, a large sum for his time. With Maredudd's death in 999, Powys passed to his son-in-law Llywelyn ap Seisyll, through Maredudd's elder daughter Princess Anghared, while Deheubarth was divided between his sons.

Gwynedd temporarily returned to the Aberffraw line, though the next century would see the abandonment of the senior historic families as increased Viking incursions and incessant warfare led usurpers to overthrow the Aberffraw and Dinefwr houses; they would not recover until the end of the 11th century. Llywelyn's son Gruffydd would unite all Wales under his own kingship, displacing his cousins in Deheubarth, even expanding into England and affecting politics there. With Gruffydd's death Deheubarth passed through a series of rulers with various claims, but would return to the historic Dinefwr dynasty in 1063 in the person of Maredudd ab Owain ab Edwin.

== House of Mathrafal ==
It is through Princess Anghared (as daughter of Maredudd ab Owain of Deheubarth and Powys), her second husband was Cynfyn ap Gwerstan, that the Mathrafal dynasty was founded. The dynasty takes its name from the historic seat of Mathrafal Castle. Anghared's son Bleddyn ap Cynfyn would inherit Powys in 1063 on the death of his maternal half-brother Gruffydd ap Llywelyn. Bleddyn (the name means wolf in Welsh) secured Gwynedd in 1063 after a battle with the Aberffraw claimant Cynan ap Iago, with Edward the Confessor of England endorsing Bleddyn's seizure later that year. Additionally, Bleddyn is recorded as amending the Law Codes of Hywel Dda.

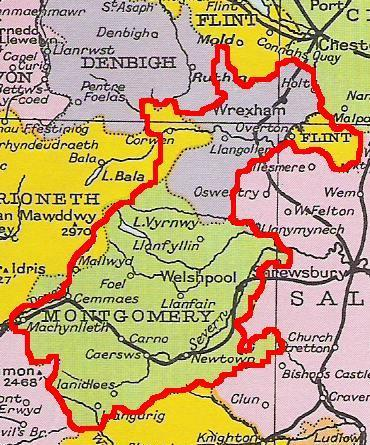
Approximate extent of Powys before division in 1160

Bleddyn ap Cynfyn and his brother Rhiwallon fought alongside the Anglo-Saxons against the Norman Invasion. In 1067 they allied with the Mercian Eadric the Wild in an attack on the Normans at Hereford, then in 1068 with Earl Edwin of Mercia and Earl Morcar of Northumbria in another attack on the Normans. In 1070 he defeated his half-nephews, the sons of Gruffydd ap Llywelyn, in the battle of Mechain in their bid to take Gwynedd. Bleddyn ap Cynfyn himself was killed in 1075 while campaigning in Deheubarth against Rhys ab Owain. With Bleddyn's death, Powys passed to his sons and grandsons in their turn. Gwynedd passed to his cousin Trehaearn ap Caradog, who was killed in 1081 at the Battle of Mynydd Carn, and would then return to the historic Aberffraw dynasty in the person of Gruffudd ap Cynan. Powys was itself divided among Bleddyn's sons Iorwerth, Cadwgan, and Maredudd.

After William the Conqueror secured England, he left the Welsh to his Norman barons to carve out lordships for themselves. Thus the Welsh Marches were formed along the Anglo-Welsh border. By 1086 the Norman Earl Roger de Montgomery of Shrewsbury had built a castle at the Severn ford of Rhydwhiman, named Montgomery Castle after his home in Normandy. After Montgomery other Normans claimed the north Powys's cantrefi of Ial, Cynllaith, Edernion, and Nanheudwy. From here they took Arwstle, Ceri, and Cedwain. Almost the whole of Powys, as much of Wales, was in Norman hands by 1090. The three sons of Bleddyn ap Cynfyn would lead the resistance and their restoration in Powys. By 1096 they had retaken most of Powys, including Montgomery Castle. Roger Montgomery rose in revolt against King William II of England, and his son Robert Belleme had his lands confiscated in 1102.

=== Division ===
Through the twelfth and thirteenth centuries the House of Mathrafal struggled to retain its lands in Powys against Norman Marcher lords and a resurgent Gwynedd. After 1160, when Madog ap Maredudd died and his son and designated heir, Llywelyn ap Madog, was killed, the realm was divided along the River Rhaeadr:

- Cantrefs north of the Rhaeadr were allocated to Madog's remaining sons:
  - Penllyn was received by Owain Brogyntyn, Prince of Powys, but almost immediately he was forced to become a vassal of neighbouring Gwynedd, and Penllyn fell under Gwynedd's yoke. He was the ancestor of the Hughes of Gwerclas and the Jones of Faerdref Uchaf.
  - Maelor and Iâl (Yale) were received by Gruffydd (subsequently Gruffydd Maelor), Prince of Powys Fadog, and ancestor of Owain Glyndwr, Prince of Wales, and the Vaughans of Corsygedeol and the Yale family.
  - Swydd y Waun (the commotes of Nanheudwy, and Cynllaith) was received by Lord Owain Fychan.
- Cantrefs south of the Rhaeadr (Cyfeiliog, Ystlyg, and Caereinion) were allocated to Owain, Prince of Powys Wenwynwyn, (subsequently Owain Cyfeiliog), the son of Madog's deceased brother
- The cantref spanning the Rhaeadr – Mochnant – was received by Prince Iorwerth Goch ap Maredudd, Madog's surviving half-brother.

In 1166, Owain Cyfeiliog and Owain Fychan attacked Iorwerth Goch, forcing him out of Mochnant, and dividing the land between them; Owain Cyfeiliog kept Mochnant Uwch Rhaeadr, while Owain Fychan kept Mochnant Is Rhaeadr (which became part of Swydd y Waun). In 1187, Owain Fychan died, and his lands were transferred to Gruffydd. By the end of the century, the resulting realms had become known by the names of the next generation of rulers:

- Powys Fadog, north of the Rhaeadr, after Madog the son of Gruffydd
- Powys Wenwynwyn, south of the Rhaeadr, after Gwenwynwyn, the son of Owain Cyfeiliog.

=== Impact of external hegemons ===
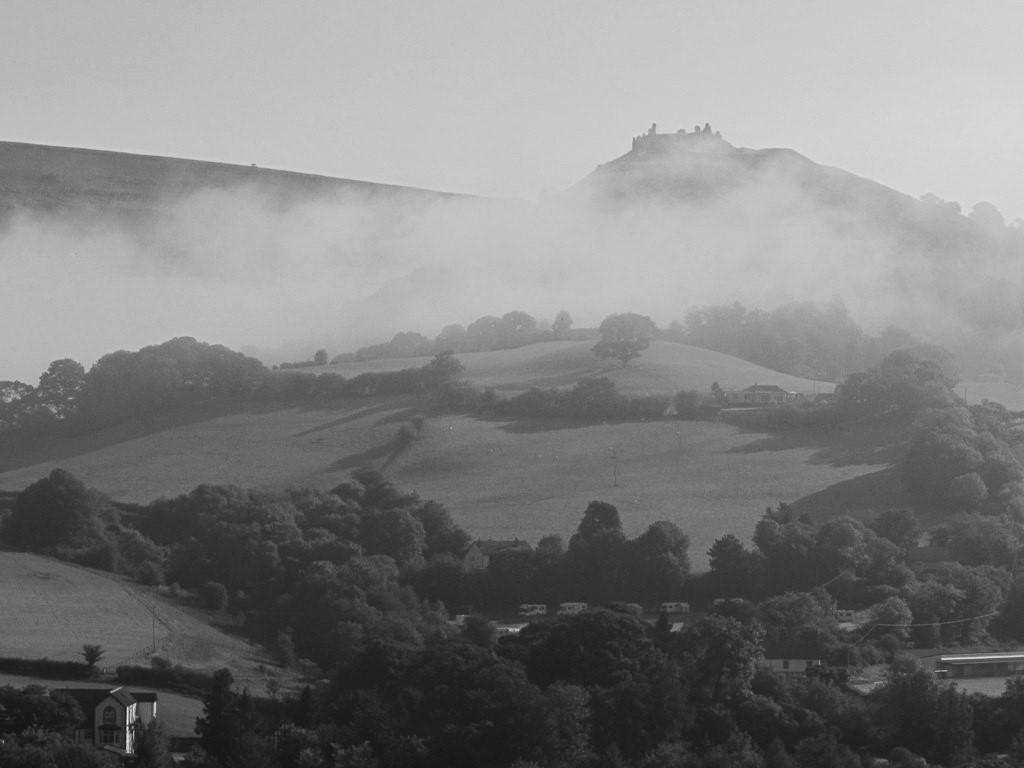
Royal seat of the princes of Powys Fadog, at Castell Dinas Bran, near Llangollen

Rhys ap Gruffydd, prince of Deheubarth, had tried to change the law to exclude his eldest son, Maelgwn, born out of wedlock, from the succession; traditional Welsh law differed from that in England and Europe, which disinherited illegitimate children. Maelgwn was forced into exile. In 1197, when Rhys died, Gwenwynwyn loaned troops to Maelgwn to help him take the throne of Deheubarth. Loyal vassals of Rhys, like the ruler of Arwystli, had sided with Gruffydd, the eldest son of Rhys to be born in wedlock, so Gwenwynwyn attacked and subjugated Arwystli; Arwystli (at that time including Cedewain) thenceforth became part of Powys Wenwynwyn.

Rhys had been the most powerful of the Welsh princes at the time, but now the princes of Gwynedd sought hegemony, gaining it under Owain Gwynedd, Llywelyn Fawr, and Dafydd ap Llywelyn. Though Powys Fadog largely supported their aspirations, Powys Wenwynwyn was frequently at loggerheads with them, and was the subject of constant attempts at encroachment by the princes of Gwynedd. Gwenwynwyn himself was driven into exile, in England.

Gwynedd was forced by King Henry III to restore Gwenwynwyn's son, Gruffydd, to power in Powys Wenwynwyn. Nevertheless, the power of Llywelyn ap Gruffudd, prince of Gwynedd, lead both divisions of Powys to acknowledge Llywelyn as Prince of Wales, by 1263. Llywelyn proceeded to cultivate relations with the enemies of King Henry III, particularly the family of Simon de Montfort.

In 1274, Llywelyn married Simon de Montfort's daughter, and Gruffydd repudiated his allegiance. Gruffydd was forced into exile in England, but the following year Llywelyn was declared a rebel by King Edward I, who launched a new campaign against Gwynedd in 1276. The success of the campaign resulted in Gruffydd being reinstated. By this time, Gruffydd's son, Owain, had chosen to anglicise his name to Owen de la Pole (taking the surname from the capital of Powys Wenwynwyn – Pool).

Following the death of Madog II, in 1269, Powys Fadog was divided among Madog's sons. When Madog's eldest son died in 1277, Edward appointed Roger Mortimer the guardian of the youngest son, still a child, to prevent Gruffudd Fychan I (Madog's eldest surviving son) taking advantage of the child's age to steal his lands. However, when the child's body was discovered in the River Dee four years later and presumed murdered, Mortimer was allowed to take the lands – the cantref of Swydd y Waun.

In 1282, Llywelyn attacked the Perfeddwlad, in contravention of the Treaty of Aberconwy, resulting in a huge counter-attack by King Edward. The forces of Gruffudd ap Gwenwynwyn were instrumental in the total defeat of Gwynedd; alongside Roger Lestrange of Ellesmere and Roger Mortimer, Gruffudd's forces ambushed Llywelyn and killed him.

== Post-kingdom Powys ==
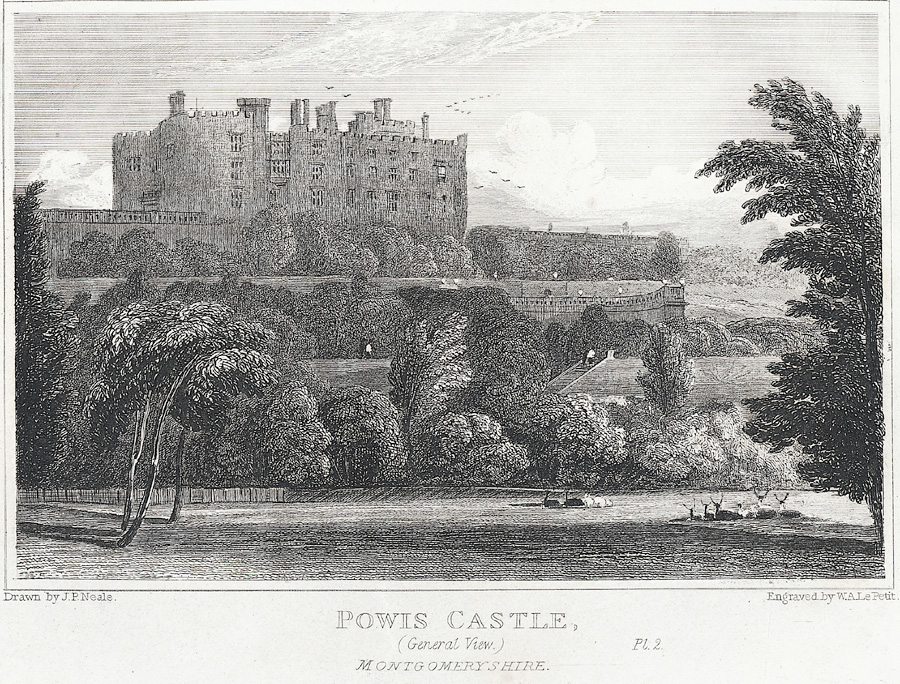
Royal seat of the princes of Powys Wenwynwyn, at Powis Castle, near Welshpool

Powys Fadog (except for Mortimer's portion) had allied with Gwynedd during Edward's 1282 invasion, so in 1283, in the aftermath of King Edward's total extinction of Gwynedd, Edward abolished Powys Fadog, granting Gruffudd Fychan's lands to John de Warenne, 6th Earl of Surrey (also known as the Earl of Warren) as the Marcher Lordship of Bromfield and Yale (Yale being Ial).

Nevertheless, the Earl argued for Gruffudd Fychan to retain a portion of Powys Fadog, for the sake of dignity or to reduce the risk of revolt; thus a small portion of Mortimer's lands (the region around Sycharth – approximately half the former commote of Cynllaith) and a small portion of the Earl's (Glyndyfrdwy) were granted to Gruffudd Fychan as a Barony (i.e. remaining ultimately subject to the authority of the Marcher Lords). The Barony survived until the rebellion (in nominal support of King Richard II's heir) of Owain Glyndŵr, the great-grandson (or great-great-grandson) of Gruffudd Fychan.

By contrast, Owen de la Pole – having been on the side of the King during the 1282 conflict – was able to strengthen his position in Powys Wenwynwyn. He converted it into a marcher lordship, via surrender and regrant – the Lordship of Powis. This made him a vassal of Edward I, enabling him to rely on English support to keep him in power, while otherwise remaining completely independent (like other Marcher Lords).

The name Powys for this area disappeared (at the latest) with the introduction of the Laws in Wales Acts 1535–1542 when its marcher lordships were incorporated into counties. Powys Fadog was joined with the Lordship of Denbigh to form Denbighshire, while Powys Wenwynwyn largely became Montgomeryshire. The lordship of Powis survived as a barony (within Montgomeryshire) – the Baron de la Pole, still held by the same family. In 1551, the Baron of Powis died without legitimate children, leaving the land to his bastard son, Edward; in 1587, Edward sold the land to Sir Edward Herbert, a distant relative, whose son was subsequently made Baron Powis. Herbert's son was created Baron Powis, and his descendants were created Marquesses and Earls of Powis, and remain living at Powis Castle.

Powys would not be resurrected as a polity until the boundary changes in 1974 created a new and enlarged county of Powys that merged the counties of Montgomeryshire, Brecknockshire and Radnorshire. However, Brecknockshire had not traditionally been within the bounds of the old kingdom, Radnorshire had not been part of it since the mid-10th century (if it ever had before, rather than just held by family members), and most of what had once been Powys Fadog was placed in the new county of Clwyd.

== Rulers of Powys ==
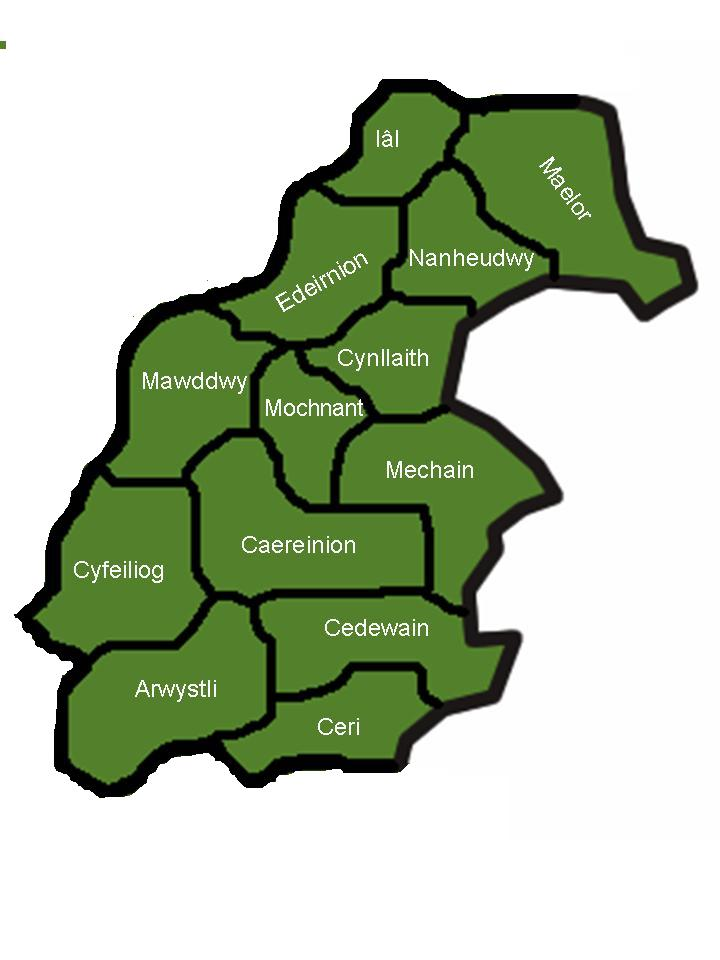
Administrative units of the Kingdom of Powys

The sequence of several of the earliest recorded rulers of Powys are known primarily from much later sources such as the Harleian Genealogies, which include several contradictory lines of Powysian kings and show every sign of scribal error and in some cases deliberate alteration. Therefore the following list cannot be considered certain.

House of Gwerthrynion

- Gwrtheyrn (High-King Vortigern), claimed to have been married to Sevira, daughter of Magnus Maximus.
- Cadeyern Fendigaid (c. 430–447); reputed eldest or second eldest son of Gwrtheyrn.
- Cadell Ddyrnllwg (c. 447–460); described in the Historia Brittonum as being blessed by Saint Germanus and successor to Benlli Gawr and not Cadeyrn, while on the Pillar of Eliseg Vortigern's son Brydu is the one blessed by Germanus
- Rhuddfedel Frych (c. 480?)
- Cyngen Glodrydd (c. 500?)
- Pasgen ap Cadeyrn (c. 530?)
- Mawgan ap Pasgen (c. 540?); alternatively a reputed grandson of Gwrtheyrn through his third son Pasgen
- Brochwel Ysgithrog (c. 550)
- Iago ap Brochwel (?–582)
- Cynan Garwyn (582–610)
- Selyf ap Cynan (610–616), killed at the Battle of Chester
- Manwgan ap Selyf (616)
- Eiludd Powys (616–?)
- Beli ap Eiludd (c. 655)
- Gwylog ap Beli (695–725)
- Elisedd ap Gwylog (725–755?)
- Brochfael ap Elisedd (755?–773)
- Cadell ap Brochfael (773–808)
- Cyngen ap Cadell (808–854); throne usurped by Gwynedd and exiled to Rome where the family endured.

House of Manaw

- Rhodri Mawr (854–878) of Gwynedd, inheriting through his mother.
- Merfyn ap Rhodri (878–900)
- Llywelyn ap Merfyn (900–942)
- Hywel Dda (942–950); usurped from the Aberffraw line.
- Owain ap Hywel (950–986); ruled thereafter by a cadet branch of the House of Dinefwr, establishing the Mathrafal dynasty of rulers.
- Maredudd ap Owain (986–999)
- Llywelyn ap Seisyll (999–1023), son of Anghered by her first husband. Anghered was the daughter of Maredudd ab Owain.
- Rhydderch ap Iestyn (1023–1033)
- Iago ap Idwal (1033–1039)
- Gruffydd ap Llywelyn (1039–1063)

Mathrafal Princes of Powys

- Bleddyn ap Cynfyn (1063–1075) and Rhiwallon ap Cynfyn (1063–1070) (co-rulers)
- Iorwerth ap Bleddyn (1075–1103; part)
- Cadwgan ap Bleddyn (1075–1111; part)
- Owain ap Cadwgan (1111–1116; part)
- Maredudd ap Bleddyn (1116–1132)
- Madog ap Maredudd (1132–1160)

From 1160 Powys was split into two parts. The southern part was later called Powys Wenwynwyn after Gwenwynwyn ab Owain "Cyfeiliog" ap Madog, while the northern part was called Powys Fadog after Madog ap Gruffydd "Maelor" ap Madog.

== Sources ==
- Davies, John (1990). History of Wales, Penguin Books.
- Llywarch Hen (attribution) (c. 9th century). Canu Heledd.
- Remfry, P. M., (2003) A Political Chronology of Wales 1066 to 1282 (ISBN 1-899376-46-1)
- Siddons, Michael Powell (1991). The Development of Welsh Heraldry. Vol. 1. Aberystwyth: National Library of Wales. ISBN 090715851X.
- —— (1993). The Development of Welsh Heraldry. Vol. 2. Aberystwyth: National Library of Wales. ISBN 090715851X.
