= Cadell Ddyrnllwg =

King of Powys

Cadell Ddyrnllwg (Welsh for 'Cadell of the Gleaming Hilt'; born c. AD 430) was a semi-legendary mid-5th century King of Powys. Much of what is known of him involves a heavily-mythologized account of his rise to power thanks to divine intervention.

== Biography ==
According to Chapters 32-35 of the Historia Brittonum, traditionally attributed to Nennius, Cadell came to power in Powys as a result of clergyman Saint Germanus of Auxerre's second visit to Britannia in the 440s. Then Bishop of Auxerre in Gaul, Germanus had been sent by his superiors to preach against Pelagian views popular among the Britons but considered heresy by the Church.

At the time the King of Powys was Benlli Gawr, possibly an Irish chieftain. The "iniquitous and tyrannical" Benlli refused Germanus entry, leaving the clergyman and his party without shelter as night approached. Cadell was one of Benlli's servants and offered Germanus lodging for the night in his home outside Benlli's residence. The next morning Germanus witnessed Benlli execute another servant for arriving late, and having determined Cadell's piety, counseled him to quit Benlli's castle and advise his friends likewise. That night "fire fell from heaven, and burned the city, together with all those who were with the tyrant, so that not one escaped; and that citadel has never been rebuilt even to this day." After the cataclysm Germanus blessed Cadell and proclaimed he and his descendants would rule in Powys from then on.

It is unclear where the Powysian capital was at the time; tradition suggests the Clwydian hillfort Foel Fenlli, the 'Hill of Benlli', while archaeological evidence points to Caer Guricon (Roman Viroconium Cornoviorum, now Wroxeter, Shropshire). The latter was occupied well into the sixth century, and an ancient memorial stone bearing the Celtic name Cunorix, known as the Wroxeter Stone, has been discovered here. However Wroxeter shows no signs of a violent end, instead being abandoned or perhaps evacuated by its occupants towards the end of the seventh century. Lewis Morris referred to Cadell as "a poor man of Iâl".

== Ddyrnllwg and "Teyrnllwg" ==
According to Peter Bartrum, the meaning of Cadell's cognomen Ddyrnllwg became obscure early on and was possibly interpreted as teyrn, meaning 'prince', and llwch, 'dust'. The author of the legend is likely to have associated Cadell with Psalm 113:7, "He raiseth up the poor out of the dust". It later came to be associated with an imagined territory named Teyrnllwg. This association began with antiquarian-forger Iolo Morganwg's manuscripts and the Brut y Tywysogion in The Myvyrian Archaiology of Wales, for which Iolo Morganwg assisted in finding manuscripts, from the nineteenth century. Other possibilities are that Cadell Ddyrnllwg is an alternative name, perhaps derived from Late Roman conventions, for the better-known figure of Vortigern, or that Cadell is one of Vortigern's descendants, perhaps a grandchild.

== Personal relationships ==
Cadell's descendents were known as the Cadelling. Bartrum's Welsh Classical Dictionary notes "confusion" about Cadell's children, some of whom were elsewhere attested as sons of Vortigern, and that the "most probable conclusion is that Cadell was father of Cyngen Glodrydd and Tegid."

== Bibliography ==
- Jones [Myvyr], Owen [Owain]; Williams [Morganwg], Edward [Iolo]; Owen Pughe [Owain Meirion], William [Gwilym], eds. (1801). "Brut y Tywysogion". The Myvyrian Archaiology of Wales: Being a Collection of Historical Documents from Ancient Manuscripts (in Welsh). Vol. II. London. p. 474. "Oed Crist 804, y bu fawr Arthen Brenin Ceredigiawn, a Rhydderch Brenin Dyfed, a Chadell Brenin Teyrnllwg, a elwir yr awr honn Powys."
- Morganwg, Iolo (1848). "Prif Gyfoethau Gwlad Gymry". In Williams, Taliesin (ed.). Iolo Manuscripts: A Selection of Ancient Welsh Manuscripts, in Prose and Verse, from the Collection Made by the Late Edward Williams, Iolo Morganwg, for the Purpose of Forming a Continuation of the Myfyrian Archaiology; and Subsequently Proposed as Materials for A New History of Wales (in Welsh). Llandovery: William Rees. p. 89. "Teyrnllwg o Aerfen hyd Argoed Dernwenyydd."
- Bartrum, Peter (1993). A Welsh Classical Dictionary: People in History and Legend Up to About A.D. 1000. National Library of Wales. ISBN 0907158730.

Preceded by Benlli Gawr? or Cadeyrn Fendigaid?	King of Powys; 447–460	Succeeded by Rhuddfedel Frych
