= First Dynasty of Gwynedd =

Welsh dynastic family

First Dynasty of Gwynedd Middle Welsh: Maelgyning
- Country: Kingdom of Gwynedd
- Origin: Manaw Gododdin (allegedly)
- Founder: Cunedda Wledig (allegedly)
- Final ruler: Hywel Farf-fehinog
- Historic seat: Aberffraw
- Deposition: c. 826; 1200 years ago

The First Dynasty of Gwynedd was the founding dynasty of the Kingdom of Gwynedd, and ruled over the kingdom for almost four hundred years. Its main branch may also be referred to as the Maelgyning, named after Maelgwn Gwynedd, an important king of the dynasty. This branch was based in Aberffraw. Its other main branch was descended from Cynlas, and was based in Rhos. The two branches at times competed for the title of king.

The members of the family claimed descent from Cunedda Wledig, who in legend arrived in Wales sometimes in the fifth century from the Brittonic-speaking areas north of Hadrian's Wall and led a campaign of ethnic cleansing against the Irish who had settled in Wales in the previous decades, founding the kingdom of Gwynedd in the process. The family ruled Gwynedd until the succession to the kingdom by the Aberffraw by Merfyn Frych, a ruler from the Isle of Man whose mother was a descendant of Cunedda. Many noble families in medieval Wales claimed descent from Cunedda in the High Middle Ages even as the First Dynasty's rule over Gwynedd had been eclipsed centuries earlier.

== History ==
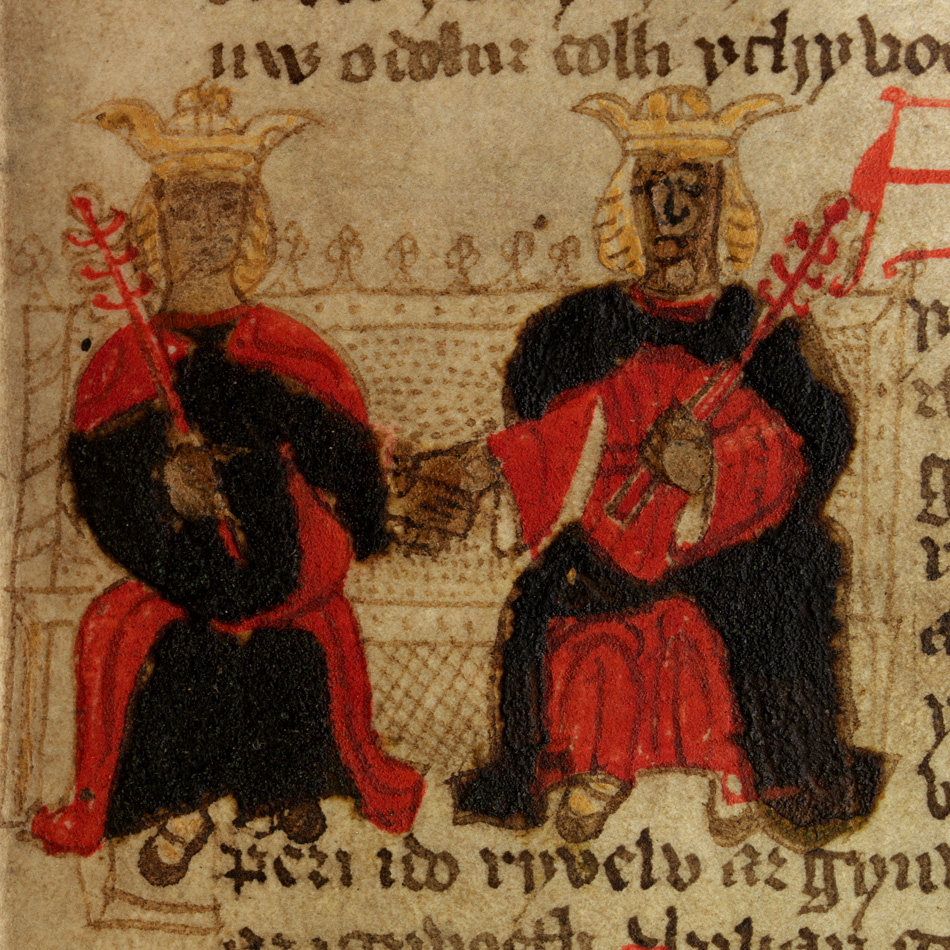
Depiction of king Cunedda, founder of the House of Cunedda

The House of Gwynedd, divided between the earlier House of Cunedda, which lasted from c.401 to 825, was eventually replaced by the later House of Aberffraw, beginning in 844. The first is so named after Cunedda (386–460), the founding King of Gwynedd in late Roman Britain; following the departure of Magnus Maximus in the 380s, and the second after Aberffraw, the old capital of the Kingdom of Gwynedd.

This House was the first not being descended from the male line of Cunedda, as king Hywel ap Rhodri Molwynog was the last in the direct male line. Through inheritances from the great-uncle of Merfyn the Oppressor, the line of Cunedda continued from the maternal side through the House of Aberffraw, and through the House of Dinefwr through Rhodri's son, King Cadell ap Rhodri.

The Senior line of the House of Aberffraw descended from Prince Llywelyn the Great in patrilineal succession and became extinct on the death of Owain Lawgoch in 1378, while the House of Dinefwr was succeeded by its cadet branch, the House of Mathrafal.

== Lineage ==
The House of Gwynedd claimed descent from the mythical king Beli Mawr through the line of Cunedda (b. 386), as appears in the Harleian genealogies and Jesus College MS 20 genealogies.

The House of Aberffraw began with the accession of Rhodri Mawr to the throne of Gwynedd. His father Merfyn Frych ap Gwriad had seized the throne of Gwynedd on the death of the last of the old royal line Hywel ap Rhodri Molwynog, Merfyn was descended from Hywel's father, but through the female line, representing a new start for the family of his son, Rhodri, who settled Aberffraw on Anglesey. He was his maternal grandnephew via the former king's niece Esyllt verch Cynan ap Rhodri Molwynog.

== Family tree of the House of Gwynedd ==
Family tree of the Gwynedd family dynasty including the descent for the Prince of Wales.

=== Key ===
Family tree
- Bold for kings & princes e.g. Llywelyn the Great.
- Italics for royal house or family e.g. House of Tudor.
- 'Standard font' for members of a royal family, i.e. heirs, children and spouses of monarchs e.g. Ethyllt ferch Cynan.

Cunedda; Gwynedd c. 386
Ceredig ap Cunedda; Ceredigion	Einion Yrth; Gwynedd
Usai ap Ceredig; Ceredigion	Cadwallon Lawhir ap Einion; Gwynedd	Owain Ddantgwyn
Serwyl ap Usai; Ceredigion	Maelgwn Gwynedd; Gwynedd –547	Cuneglasus; Rhos
Boddw ap Serwyl; Ceredigion	Rhun ap Maelgwn; Gwynedd; 547–	Meig ap Cynlas	Einion ap Cynlas; Rhos
Arthfoddw ap Boddw; Ceredigion	Beli ap Rhun; Gwynedd	Cyngen ap Meig
Arthlwys ap Arthwfoddw; Ceredigion	Iago ap Beli; Gwynedd –616	Cadwal Crysban ap Cyngen
Cadfan ap Iago; Gwynedd; 616–c.625	Idgwyn ap Cadwal
Clydog ap Arthlwys; Ceredigion	Cadwallon ap Cadfan; Gwynedd c.625–634	Einion ap Idgwyn
Seisyll ap Clydog; Ceredigion	Cadwaladr; Gwynedd; 655–682	Rhufon ap Einion
Arthgen ap Seisyll; Seisyllwg –807	Idwal Iwrch; Gwynedd; 682–720	Meirion ap Rhufon
Dyfnwal ap Arthgen; Seisyllwg; 807–	Rhodri Molwynog ap Idwal; Gwynedd; 720–754	Caradog ap Meirion; Gwynedd; 754–798
Meurig ap Dyfnwal; Seisyllwg	Cynan Dindaethwy ap Rhodri; Gwynedd; 798–816	Hywel ap Rhodri Molwynog; Gwynedd; 816–825
Esyllt ferch Cynan	Gwriad ap Elidyr
Gwgon ap Meurig; Seisyllwg –872	Merfyn Frych; Gwynedd; 825–844	Nest ferch Cadell
Angharad ferch Meurig	Rhodri the Great Gwynedd; 844–878; Powys 855–878
Anarawd ap Rhodri; Gwynedd; 878–916	Tudwal Gloff	Merfyn ap Rhodri; Powys; 878–900	Cadell ap Rhodri b.854 Seisyllwg; 878–909
Idwal Foel; Gwynedd; 916–942	Alser ap Tudwal	Llywelyn ap Merfyn; Powys; 900–942	Hywel Dda b.880 Dyfed; 905–909; Deheubarth; 909–950; Gwynedd; 942–950; Powys; 942–950	Elen ferch Llywarch
Meurig ap Idwal	Iago ap Idwal; Gwynedd; 950–979	Ieuaf ap Idwal; Gwynedd; 950–969	Rhodri ap Hywel; Deheubarth; 950–953	Owain ap Hywel; Deheubarth; 950–987	Edwin ap Hywel; Deheubarth; 950–954
Idwal ap Meurig	Hywel ap Ieuaf; Gwynedd; 979–985	Cadwallon ab Ieuaf; Gwynedd; 985–986	Einion ab Owain d.984	Maredudd ab Owain; Deheubarth; 987–999; Gwynedd; 986–999
Iago ab Idwal ap Meurig; Gwynedd; 1023–1039	Cynan ap Hywel; Gwynedd; 999–1005	Aeddan ap Blegywryd; Gwynedd; 1005–1018	Edwin ab Einion; Deheubarth; 1005–1018	Cadell ab Einion; Deheubarth; 1005–1018	Cynfyn ap Gwerstan	Angharad ferch Maredudd	Llywelyn ap Seisyll; Gwynedd; 1018–1023; Deheubarth; 1018–1023
Cynan ab Iago; 1014–1063	Trahaearn ap Caradog; Gwynedd; 1075–1081	Owain ab Edwin	Hywel ab Edwin; Deheubarth; 1033–1044	Tewdwr ap Cadell	Rhiwallon ap Cynfyn; 1020–1069	Bleddyn ap Cynfyn; Gwynedd; 1063–1075; Powys; 1063–1075	Gruffydd ap Llywelyn; Gwynedd; 1039–1063; Powys; 1039–1063; Deheubarth; 1055–1063
Gruffudd ap Cynan b.1055 Gwynedd; 1081–1137	Angharad ferch Owain; Deheubarth; 1065–1162	Maredudd ab Owain ab Edwin; Deheubarth; 1063–1072	Rhys ab Owain; Deheubarth; 1072–1078	Rhys ap Tewdwr; Deheubarth; 1078–1093	Gwladys ferch Rhiwallon	Iorwerth ap Bleddyn; Powys; 1075–1103	Maredudd ap Bleddyn; Powys; 1116–1132	Cadwgan ap Bleddyn; Powys; 1075–1111
Cadwaladr ap Gruffydd; 1096–1172	Gwenllian ferch Gruffydd; 1097–1136	Gruffydd ap Rhys; Deheubarth; 1116–1137	Nest ferch Rhys; 1085–1136	Susanna ferch Gruffydd	Madog ap Maredudd; Powys; 1132–1160	Gruffydd ap Maredudd	Lord of Nannau
Owain Gwynedd b.1100 Gwynedd; 1137–1170	Cadell ap Gruffydd; Deheubarth; 1143–1153	Maredudd ap Gruffydd; Deheubarth; 1153–1155	Anarawd ap Gruffydd; Deheubarth; 1137–1143	Rhys ap Gruffydd b.1132 Deheubarth; 1155–1197	Gwenllian ferch Madog	Owain Cyfeiliog; Powys Wenwynwyn; 1160–1197
Hywel ab Owain Gwynedd b.1120 Gwynedd; 1170	Dafydd ab Owain Gwynedd; Gwynedd; 1170–1195 d. 1203	Maelgwn ab Owain Gwynedd; Gwynedd; 1170–1173	Cynan ab Owain Gwynedd	Rhodri ab Owain Gwynedd; 1135–1195	Gwenllian ferch Rhys	Gruffydd ap Rhys II; Deheubarth; 1197–1201	Rhys Gryg; Deheubarth; 1216–1234	Angharad ferch Owain Gwynedd	Gruffydd Maelor I Powys Fadog; 1160–1191
Iorwerth Drwyndwn; 1145–1174	Marared ferch Madog	Gruffudd ap Cynan ab Owain Gwynedd; 1150–1200	Maredudd ap Cynan ab Owain Gwynedd; 1150–1212	Anwyl of Tywyn family & Wynn baronets descendants	Maelgwn ap Rhys; Deheubarth; 1201–1230	Gwenllian ferch Rhys	Ednyfed Fychan; 1170–1246	Madog ap Gruffydd Maelor; Powys Fadog; 1191–1236	Gwenwynwyn; Powys Wenwynwyn; 1197–1216
Tangwystl Goch	Llywelyn the Great b.1173 Gwynedd; 1195–1240; Powys; 1216–1240	Joan Plantagenet, Lady of Wales	Llywelyn the Elder ap Maredudd	Goronwy ab Ednyfed; 1205–1268	Owain ap Gruffudd	Maredudd ap Rhys Grug d.1271	Gruffydd II ap Madog; Powys Fadog; 1236–1269	Gruffydd ap Gwenwynwyn; Powys Wenwynwyn; 1241–1287
Gruffudd ap Llywelyn; 1200–1244	Dafydd ap Llywelyn b.1215 Wales; 1240–1246	Angharad ferch Llywelyn	Maelgwn Fychan	Maredudd ap Llywelyn d. 1255	Rhys ap Maredudd; 1250–1292	Lord of Powys
Llywelyn ap Gruffudd b.1223 Wales; 1246–1282	Owain Goch ap Gruffudd d. 1282; Gwynedd; 1246–1255	Dafydd ap Gruffudd; 1238–1283	Rhodri ap Gruffudd; 1230–1315	Llywelyn ap Maredudd d.1263	Tudur Hen d.1311	Maredydd ab Owain	Elen ferch Maelgwn
Catherine ferch Llywelyn	Llywelyn ap Dafydd; 1267–1287	Owain ap Dafydd; 1265–1325	Tomas ap Rhodri; 1300–1363	Madog ap Llywelyn claimant 1294–1295	Goronwy ap Tudur Hen d.1331	Owain ap Maredydd	Gruffudd Fychan I Powys Fadog; 1277–1283	Madog II ap Gruffydd; Powys Fadog; 1269–1277
Owain Lawgoch; 1330–1378	Llywelyn ab Owain	Madog Crypl; 1275–1304
Eleanor Goch	Tomas ap Llewelyn	Gruffydd of Rhuddallt; 1296–1343
Tudur ap Goronwy d.1367	Marged ferch Tomos	Elen ferch Tomos	Gruffudd Fychan II d. 1369
Maredudd ap Tudur d.1406	Owain Glyndŵr claimant 1400–1415
Owen Tudor; 1400–1461	Amongst others: Croft baronets
House of Tudor

== See also ==
- Dynasties of Gwynedd topics
- Medieval Wales topics
- Monarchs of Gwynedd
- Second Dynasty of Gwynedd
