= 950 =

Calendar year

950 in various calendars
- Gregorian calendar: 950; CML
- Ab urbe condita: 1703
- Armenian calendar: 399; ԹՎ ՅՂԹ
- Assyrian calendar: 5700
- Balinese saka calendar: 871–872
- Bengali calendar: 356–357
- Berber calendar: 1900
- Buddhist calendar: 1494
- Burmese calendar: 312
- Byzantine calendar: 6458–6459
- Chinese calendar: 己酉年 (Earth Rooster); 3647 or 3440 — to — 庚戌年 (Metal Dog); 3648 or 3441
- Coptic calendar: 666–667
- Discordian calendar: 2116
- Ethiopian calendar: 942–943
- Hebrew calendar: 4710–4711
- Hindu calendars
- Vikram Samvat: 1006–1007
- Shaka Samvat: 871–872
- Kali Yuga: 4050–4051
- Holocene calendar: 10950
- Iranian calendar: 328–329
- Islamic calendar: 338–339
- Japanese calendar: Tenryaku 4 (天暦４年)
- Javanese calendar: 850–851
- Julian calendar: 950; CML
- Korean calendar: 3283
- Minguo calendar: 962 before ROC 民前962年
- Nanakshahi calendar: −518
- Seleucid era: 1261/1262 AG
- Thai solar calendar: 1492–1493
- Tibetan calendar: ས་མོ་བྱ་ལོ་ (female Earth-Bird); 1076 or 695 or −77 — to — ལྕགས་ཕོ་ཁྱི་ལོ་ (male Iron-Dog); 1077 or 696 or −76

Eastern Themata of the Byzantine Empire.

Year 950 (CML) was a common year starting on Tuesday of the Julian calendar.

== Events ==
=== By place ===
==== Byzantine Empire ====
- Arab–Byzantine War: A Hamdanid army (30,000 men) led by Sayf al-Dawla raids into Byzantine theme Anatolia. He defeats Bardas Phokas, but is then ambushed on his return and heavily defeated by Leo Phokas.

==== Europe ====
- November 22 – King Lothair II dies at Turin (possibly poisoned by Berengar of Ivrea). Berengar is crowned king of Italy and imprisons Lothair's now 19-year-old widow, Adelaide for four months at Como.
- Boleslav I, duke of Bohemia, signs a peace treaty with King Otto I of the East Frankish Kingdom. He becomes his ally, but he probably wasn't forced to resume the payment of tribute.
- Henry I, duke of Bavaria, attacks Western Hungary, taking captives and plunder. He enlarges his duchy in the wars with the Hungarians.
- in Wales, King Hywel Dda ("the Good") dies after an 8-year reign in which he has established codified laws. His three sons Owain ap Hywel Dda, Rhodri ap Hywel, and Edwin ap Hywel divide Wales amongst themselves.

==== Oceania ====
- The Tu'i Tonga Empire starts to expand in the Pacific Ocean. The Tu'i Tonga kings establish the capital at Mu'a on the island of Tongatapu (approximate date).

==== North America ====
- The Mount Edziza volcanic complex in British Columbia, Canada, produces an explosive eruption that deposits the Sheep Track Member.

==== Africa ====
- City of Mogadishu is established.

==== Asia ====
- In Tĩnh Hải quân, Dương Tam Kha was dethroned by Ngô Xương Văn after ruling for 6 years (since 944) as Dương Bình Vương, having usurped the throne from the Ngô Dynasty.

=== By topic ===
==== Religion ====
- Page with Joshua Leading the Israelites, from the Joshua Roll, is made in Constantinople. It is now kept at the Biblioteca Apostolica Vaticana in Rome (approximate date).

== Births ==
- June 12 – Reizei, Japanese emperor (d. 1011)
- Bernard I, German nobleman (approximate date)
- Dedo I, German nobleman (approximate date)
- Egbert, archbishop of Trier (approximate date)
- Emma of Blois, duchess of Aquitaine (d. 1003)
- Erik the Red, Norse Viking explorer (d. 1003)
- Guy of Anderlecht, Christian saint (d. 1012)
- Herbert III, Frankish nobleman (d. 995)
- Ibn Yunus, Fatamid astronomer (d. 1009)
- Lady Finella, Scottish noblewoman (d. 995)
- Lambert I of Louvain, French nobleman (approximate date)
- Lothair Udo I, Count of Stade, German nobleman (d. 994)
- Masako, Japanese empress consort (d. 1000)
- Moninho Viegas, French knight (d. 1022)
- Notker III, German Benedictine monk (d. 1022)
- Odo I (or Eudes), French nobleman (d. 996)
- Otto I, duke of Carinthia (approximate date)
- Reginar IV, French nobleman (approximate date)
- Sarolt, Grand Princess of Hungary (d. 1008)
- Soběslav, Bohemian nobleman (d. 1004)
- William I, French nobleman (approximate date)
- Wolbodo, bishop of Liège (approximate date)

== Deaths ==
- January 15 – Wang Jingchong, Chinese general
- October 7 – Li, Chinese empress consort
- October – Al-Qahir, Abbasid caliph (b. 899)
- November 22 – Lothair II, king of Italy
- December 24
  - Shi Hongzhao, Chinese general
  - Wang Zhang, Chinese official
  - Yang Bin, Chinese chancellor
- Ælfric, bishop of Ramsbury (approximate date)
- Al-Farabi, Muslim philosopher (or 951)
- Hywel Dda ("the Good"), king of Wales
- Li Jinquan, Chinese general (approximate date)
- Ricfried, Frankish nobleman (b. 845)
- Sunyer, count of Barcelona, Girona and Ausona
- Zoltán, Grand Prince of Hungary (approximate date)
- Dharma Mahadevi, Indian Queen Regnant
