= Rhodri ab Idwal Foel =

Welsh king (died c. 970)

Rhodri ab Idwal (died c. 970) was a 10th-century prince of Gwynedd from the royal dynasty of Aberffraw.

He was one of six children of King Idwal the Bald of Gwynedd, who was killed along with his brother Elissed ab Anarawd during an English invasion c. 943, after which the kingdom initially passed to King Hywel the Good of Deheubarth rather than any of Idwal's heirs. At the death of Hywel, Idwal's sons rebelled against the new king Owain and his brothers.

Rhodri's murder was recorded in the undated Annals of Wales; Phillimore's reconstruction would place the entry in AD 969. The Chronicle of the Princes records the murder in AD 966 and attributes it to the Irish of Anglesey. His brother Iago is said to have destroyed the Irish at Aberffraw in retribution and then chased them completely out of Gwynedd.

Moore attributed the destructive civil war among Idwal Foel's other children to the death of Rhodri, although the kingship had been assumed by his elder brothers Iefan and Iago.
