= Edwin ap Hywel =

King of Deheubarth

Edwin ap Hywel (died c. 954) (sometimes recorded as Gwyn) was a 10th-century king of Deheubarth in Wales of the High Middle Ages.

Edwin ap Hywel was descended from a long line of intermarrying Welsh princely houses. His father Hywel Dda married Elen ferch Llywarch (d. 929), daughter of King Llywarch ap Hyfaidd of Dyfed (d. 904), and took over the kingdom of Deheubarth after the murder of her uncle Rhodri ap Hyfaidd in Arwystli in mid Wales (c. 905). This was thought to be an execution following a defeat in battle against Hywel, his father Cadell ap Rhodri, King of Seisyllwg (d. 909) or his uncle Anarawd ap Rhodri, King of Gwynedd (d.916).

Edwin's name is not Welsh but Saxon English, and there has been some debate as to the source of and reasoning for his name, when his siblings and wider relatives tended to be named for Welsh dynastic or geographic reasons. His father was an ally of the English kings, of the House of Wessex.

On Hywel Dda's death in 950, Deheubarth was shared between Edwin and his two brothers, Rhodri ap Hywel Dda (d. c. 953 or 954) and Owain ap Hywel Dda (d. c. 988). He may have had other brothers: Rhain (sometimes spelled Rhun) is considered definitive and there are suggestions of a Hywel Fychan, an Einion and a Dyfnwal (or Dyfnwallon) as well.

The sons of Hywel had not been able to retain their hold of Gwynedd, which was reclaimed for the traditional dynasty of Aberffraw by Iago ap Idwal and Ieuaf ap Idwal, the sons of Idwal Foel, who had been a first cousin to Hywel Dda.

In 952 Iago and Ieuaf ap Idwal invaded the south, penetrating as far as Dyfed. The sons of Hywel Dda retaliated by invading the north in 954, reaching as far north as the Conwy valley before being defeated in a battle at Llanrwst in Conwy and being obliged to retreat to Ceredigion. It is thought that Edwin ap Hywel was killed at the battle of Llanrwst in 954.

His brother Rhodri predeceased him in either 953 or 954 and his brother Owain survived him as sole ruler of Dehubarth. The kingdom would later be ruled by Owain's descendants, including Maredudd ab Owain (d. 999).

Preceded by Hywel Dda	Joint King of Deheubarth; 950–954	Succeeded by Owain ap Hywel
