= Rhodri ap Hywel =

King of Deheubarth in south Wales (died 953/4)

Rhodri ap Hywel (died 953 or 954) was a King of Deheubarth in South Wales, and a son of Hywel Dda, King of Deheubarth and Gwynedd, known for his codification of Welsh laws.

Rhodri came from a long line of intermarrying Welsh princely houses. His father Hywel Dda married Elen ferch Llywarch (d. 929), daughter of King Llywarch ap Hyfaidd of Dyfed (d. 904), and took over the kingdom of Deheubarth after the murder of her uncle Rhodri ap Hyfaidd in Arwystli in mid Wales (c. 905). This was thought to be an execution following a defeat in battle against Hywel, his father Cadell ap Rhodri, King of Seisyllwg (d. 909) or his uncle Anarawd ap Rhodri, King of Gwynedd (d.916).

On Hywel Dda's death in 950, Deheubarth was shared between Rhodri and his two brothers, Edwin ap Hywel Dda (sometimes referred to as Gwyn) (d. c. 954) and Owain ap Hywel Dda (d. c. 988). He may have had other brothers: Rhain (sometimes spelled Rhun) is considered definitive and there are suggestions of a Hywel Fychan, an Einion and a Dyfnwal (or Dyfnwallon) as well.

The sons of Hywel had not been able to retain their hold of Gwynedd, which was reclaimed for the traditional dynasty of Aberffraw by Iago ap Idwal and Ieuaf ap Idwal, the sons of Idwal Foel, who had been a first cousin to Hywel Dda.

In 952 Iago and Ieuaf ap Idwal invaded the south, penetrating as far as Dyfed. The sons of Hywel Dda retaliated by invading the north in 954, reaching as far north as the Conwy valley before being defeated in a battle at Llanrwst and being obliged to retreat to Ceredigion.

Rhodri is thought to have died in either 953 or 954 and Edwin in 954, leaving Owain in sole possession of Deheubarth.

Preceded by Hywel Dda	Joint King of Deheubarth; 950–964	Succeeded by Edwin ap Hywel
Preceded by Hywel Dda	Joint King of Deheubarth; 950–964	Succeeded by Owain ap Hywel
