= Cadwallon ab Ieuaf =

King of Gwynedd from 985 to 986

Cadwallon ab Iueaf
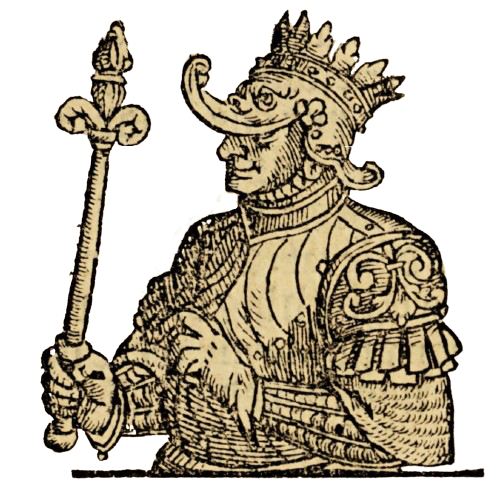
- A fanciful illustration of Cadwallon ab Ieuaf from the Historie of Cambria (1584)

King of Gwynedd
- Reign: c. 985-986
- Predecessor: Hywel Dda
- Died: c. 986
- Father: Idwal Foel

Cadwallon ap Ieuaf (died 986) was a King of Gwynedd from 985 to 986, inheriting the Kingdom of Gwynedd after the death of his older brother Hywel ap Ieuaf in 985.

Cadwallon was the son of Ieuaf ap Idwal, son of King Idwal Foel (Idwal the Bald), who had become King of Gwynedd from 916 on the death of his father Anarawd ap Rhodri. Cadwallon's paternal great grandparents were Rhodri Mawr, King of Gwynedd and Angharad ferch Meurig of Ceredigion.

Cadwallon was the younger son of Ieuaf. Upon his grandfather Idwal Foel's death in battle against the Anglo-Saxons in 942, Cadwallon's father Ieuaf and his uncle Iago ab Idwal were driven from their kingdom by their uncle Hywel Dda of Deheubarth, who took the crown for himself. The brothers later reclaimed their inheritance in 950 after Hywel's death. They ruled Gwynedd jointly until 969 when the two brothers quarrelled and Iago took Ieuaf prisoner. Some sources claim Iago had Ieuaf hanged, others that Ieuaf was imprisoned until 988. Cadwallon's uncle Iago then ruled most of another decade. In 974, Cadwallon's brother Hywel ap Ieuaf raised an army and managed to depose and temporarily drive his uncle Iago from Gwynedd. Iago later returned to the throne for a short time.

In 978 Hywel made another attempt to take the kingdom from Iago, and raided the monastery at Clynnog Fawr, assisted by English troops, possibly provided by Ælfhere, Earl of Mercia. Hywel defeated Iago in battle in 979, and the same year Iago was captured by a force of Vikings, possibly in Hywel's pay, and Iago disappears from the historical record. There appear to be no surviving record of Iago's fate, but his son Custennin Ddu was killed whilst raiding the Llŷn peninsula and Anglesey in 980 in conjunction with the Viking chief Gofraid mac Arailt, king of Man.

Hywel made an alliance with the Saxon Ælfhere and attacked Brycheiniog and Morgannwg with some success, but 985 his English allies turned on him and killed him.

Cadwallon succeeded to the throne of Gwynedd on the death of his brother Hywel ap Ieuaf in 985. He only reigned for a year, for in 986 Maredudd ab Owain of Deheubarth invaded Gwynedd, slew Cadwallon and annexed his kingdom. This was inherited by Maredudd's grandson by his daughter Angharad, Gruffudd ap Llywellyn who became King of Wales.

Preceded by Hywel ap Ieuaf	Kingdom of Gwynedd; 985–986	Succeeded by Maredudd ab Owain

== Sources ==
- Powel, David (1584). The historie of Cambria, now called Wales: a part of the most famous Yland of Brytaine, written in the Brytish language aboue two hundreth yeares past. Translated by Llwyd, Humphrey. London: Rafe Newberrie and Henrie Denham. IA historieofcambri00cara.
