= Rhodri ab Idwal =

Rhodri ab Idwal or Ithel ('Roderick son of Idwal') is a Welsh name that may refer to:

- King Rhodri Molwynog of Gwynedd (8th century)
- King Rhodri ab Idwal (Glywysing) of Glywysing (9th century)
- Prince Rhodri ab Idwal Foel of Gwynedd (10th century)
