= Einion ab Owain =

Welsh prince (died c. 984)

Einion ab Owain (died c. 984) was a medieval Welsh prince of the House of Dinefwr. He was the eldest son and probable edling of King Owain of Dyfed, son of Hywel Dda.

The Chronicle of the Princes records Einion assisting King Iago of Gwynedd in driving the Irish and their Danish allies from Wales in 966. Einion then raided Gower again the next year, "on the pretense" of opposing the pagan Vikings and their supporters. This prompted a retaliatory raid by King Owain of Morgannwg, who brought Gower back under his control, and an invasion by King Edgar of England, who forced Einion's father Owain to swear fealty to him at Caerleon upon Usk. A third raid in 976 went little better: Einion is recorded devastating the area so thoroughly it provoked famine but Owain ap Morgan's brother Ithel defeated him and restored the plunder to its owners. At some point, he seems to have annexed Brycheiniog for Deheubarth and King Hywel of Gwynedd—with the support of Ælfhere of Mercia—then invaded in 980 and 981. Einion defeated them at Llanwenog and in Brycheiniog but the country was heavily despoiled by the northerners and the English and by a Viking raid against St. David's in 980 or 982.

Einion predeceased his father, being slain at Pencoed Colwynn by the men of Glywysing and Gwent in AD 982 or 984. His offices were taken by his brother Maredudd, rather than by either of his sons. His line recovered the throne under his grandson Hywel around 1035.

He is sometimes credited with being the namesake of Port Eynon or Einon on the Gower peninsula.

== Children ==
- Gronwy Ap Einion
- Edwin (slain 993)
- Tewdwr (slain 993)
- Cadell, whose grandson was Rhys ap Tewdwr. Probably slain in 993.
- Gwladys
- Gwenllian, typically but probably erroneously credited with marrying Elystan Glodrydd
- Marred
