= Cadelling (Deheubarth) =

Welsh dynastic family

Cadelling Middle Welsh: Katelling
- Arms of Richard Talbot, 2nd Baron Talbot, claimed to represent the arms of this dynasty
- Parent house: Second Dynasty of Gwynedd
- Country: Kingdom of Dyfed; Kingdom of Gwynedd; Principality of Deheubarth
- Origin: Kingdom of Gwynedd
- Founded: c. 900; 1126 years ago
- Founder: Cadell ap Rhodri
- Final ruler: Rhys ap Gruffudd
- Final head: Maelgwn ap Rhys

The dynasty of the Cadelling, also known as the House of Deheubarth or the House of Dinefwr after its seat in the late twelfth and early thirteenth centuries, was a medieval Welsh dynasty founded at the turn of the tenth century and primarily associated with the Kingdom of Dyfed and later Deheubarth. It was named after its founder, Cadell ap Rhodri, a son of Rhodri Mawr of Gwynedd who conquered south-west Wales around 900 AD.

Many members of this family were influential in Welsh history, such as Hywel Dda, who allegedly codified Welsh law under his rule, and achieved the important title of King of the Britons, or Lord Rhys, Prince of Wales, who rebelled against Richard the Lionheart, and became one of the most powerful Welsh leaders of the Middle Ages.

== History ==
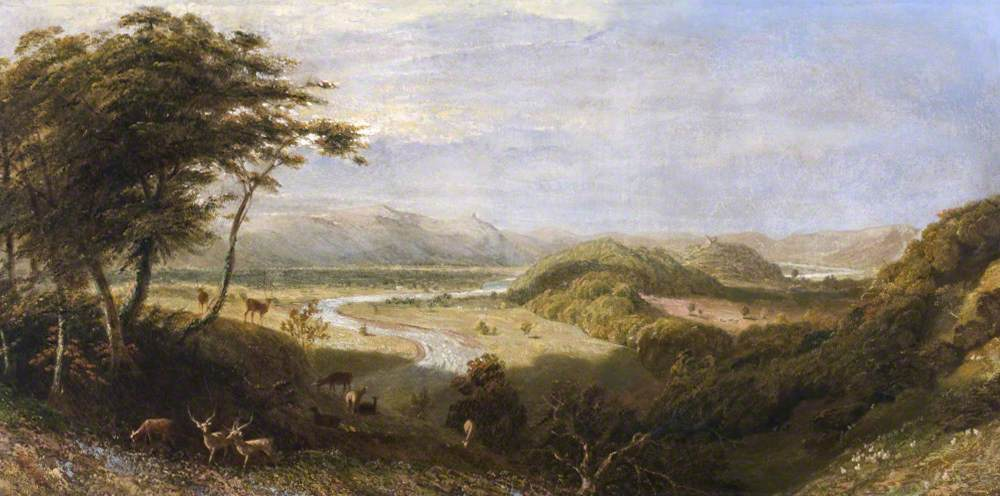
Painting of Dinefwr Castle, ancient seat of the Royal House of Dinefwr, in Deheubarth

With the death of Rhodri Mawr, the Kingdom of Gwynedd passed to his eldest son Anarawd ap Rhodri. Rhodri's second son Cadell ap Rhodri, however, looked outside Gwynedd's traditional borders and took possession of the Early Medieval Kingdom of Dyfed by the late 9th century. The family is known as the Cadelling after Cadell ap Rhodri.

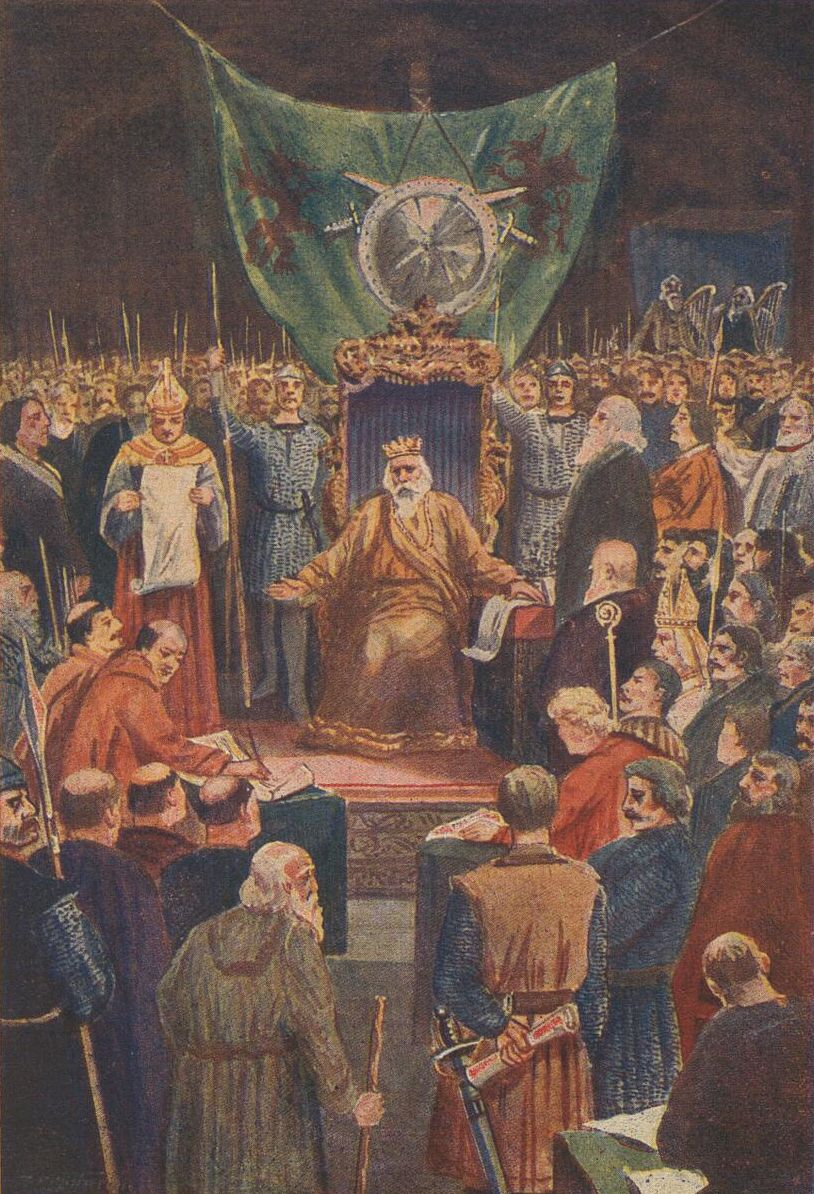
King Hywel Dda proclaiming his laws

The Cadelling under King Hywel Dda would unite Dyfed and Seisyllwg into the Kingdom of Deheubarth in the early 10th century. During his reign, Hywel Dda would have to submit to the King of the Anglo-Saxons, Edward the Elder, and thereafter support his successor King Æthelstan, the first King of England, and his invasion of Scotland. His legacy would be the codification of Welsh law known as the Laws of Hywel Dda, as he had gathered expert lawyers and priests from all over the country under his leadership for its formation.

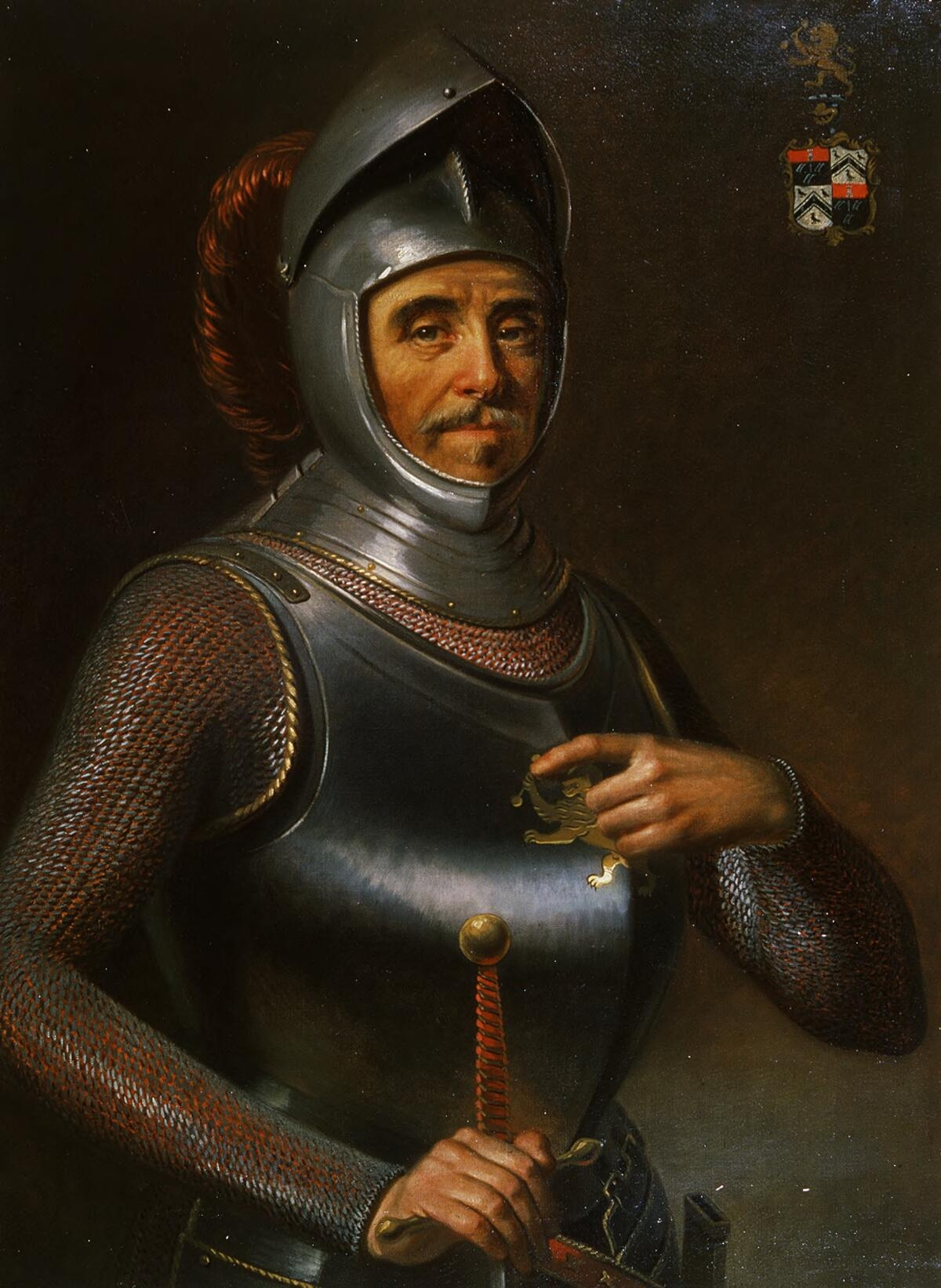
Lord Rhys, Prince of Wales, followed John Plantagenet to meet his brother, Richard the Lionheart, to settle a dispute

The Cadelling would rule in Deheubarth until their conquest by the Plantagenet kings in the 13th century. This branch would compete with the House of Aberffraw for supremacy and influence in Wales throughout the 10th, 11th and 12th centuries, with the Kingdom of Powys variously ruled between them.

During the 12th century, Lord Rhys's father, Prince Gruffydd ap Rhys, fought the Normans following the civil war in England and Normandy. This war arose from the rival claims of Stephen of Blois and Empress Matilda to the throne England as descendants of William the Conqueror. From that era, Lord Rhys would end up becoming one of the most successful and powerful Welsh leaders of the Middle Ages, fighting against King Henry Plantagenet as well as against his son, Richard the Lionheart, attacking his Norman lordship and capturing many of his castles. Through Lord Rhys's daughter Gwenllian, wife of Seneschal Ednyfed Fychan, he would also become an ancestor of the House of Tudor, House of Stuart, as well as the current reigning House of Windsor.

== Arms ==
Coat of arms of Cadelling
Notes There is no contemporaneous record of the arms of this dynasty. They first appear used by Richard Talbot, 2nd Baron Talbot, whose mother was Gwenllian, a daughter of Rhys Mechyll ap Rhys Gryg of this family. Richard was found to be heir of his cousin Llywelyn ap Rhys Fychan ap Rhys Mechyll. Similarly, permission was asked in 1603 of Gilbert Talbot, 7th Earl of Shrewsbury, for the exemplification of this coat to a certain Walter Jones of Worcester, who claimed descent from the Cadelling. Escutcheon Gules, a lion rampant and a bordure indented Or.

=== Before the Norman Conquest of England ===
- Hywel Dda, Prince of Seisyllwg and Deheubarth, King of Dyfed, Powys and Gwynedd, he codified Welsh law under his rule, known as the Laws of Hywel Dda, and did a pilgrimage to Rome later in his life
- Owain ap Hywel Dda, King of South Wales, he attacked the Kingdom of Morgannwg with his sons, and paid tribute to the English king Edgar the Peaceful, a member of the Royal House of Wessex
- Maredudd ab Owain, King of the Britons, he was featured in the Chronicle of the Princes, and struggled on many occasions with Vikings and their invasions in Wales, he raided the Kingdom of Mercia
- Maredudd ab Owain ab Edwin, Welsh prince, he fought against the Normans and supported the English magnate Eadric the Wild in his conquest, was awarded lands in England as a result
- Rhys ab Owain, King of Deheubarth, he fought against the King of Gwynedd and Powys, he was killed at war by Prince Caradog ap Gruffydd, he was implicated in the killing of King Bleddyn ap Cynfyn
- Cadell ap Rhodri, King of Seisyllwg, ruled a minor kingdom in south of Wales, was nephew of Gwgon, King of Ceredigion, with his son they conquered the Kingdom of Dyfed
- Einion ab Owain, Welsh prince, he fought with King Iago ab Idwal against the Irish and Vikings, and later against Ælfhere, Ealdorman of Mercia, he was in conflict with Edgar, King of England
- Llywelyn ap Seisyll, King of the Britons, killed prince Aeddan ap Blegywryd, and was featured in Brut y Tywysogion and Annals of Ulster, his sons died fighting at the Battle of Mechain
- Rhain the Irishman, King of Dyfed, featured in the Annales Cambriae, possible pretender to the throne, killed by King Llywelyn ap Seisyll, his body was not discovered
- Rhodri ap Hywel, King of Deheubarth, son of the King of the Britons, co-ruled with Edwin and Owain, lost land to the Aberffraw dynasty, and was defeated at a Battle in Llanrwst

=== After the Norman Conquest of England ===
- Rhys ap Tewdwr, King in Southern Wales, made an agreement with William the Conqueror for his Kingdom, was later forced to flee to Ireland, came back with a fleet and attacked the Royal House of Mathrafal
- Gruffydd ap Rhys, prince of Deheubarth, fought against the Normans following the wars of Stephen of Blois and Empress Matilda, he refused to pay homage to King Stephen of England in London
- Nest ferch Rhys, Welsh Princess, she was brought at the court of King William Rufus, son of William the Conqueror, she married Gerald of Windsor, founder of the House of Fitzgerald, and former Constable of Pembroke Castle
- Rhys ap Gruffydd, Prince of Wales, fought against Richard the Lionheart, captured many of his castles, and built Carreg Cennen castle, was summoned by King Henry Plantagenet to pay him homage with Malcolm IV of Scotland
- Gwenllian, daughter of Rhys ap Gruffydd, married to Seneschal Ednyfed Fychan, who fought against the army of Ranulph de Blondeville, 4th Earl of Chester, she was ancestor of Sir Owen Tudor and the Tudor dynasty
- Angharad, daughter of Rhys ap Gruffydd, married to William FitzMartin, Lord of Cemais, his castle was taken by his father-in-law and given to his son, her father was the most powerful man in Wales
- Annest ferch Rhys, daughter of Rhys ap Gruffydd, married to Rhodri ab Owain, a Prince of Gwynedd, of the Royal House of Aberffraw, he made an alliance with Raghnall mac Gofraidh, King of Mann and the Isles
- Gruffydd ap Rhys II, Welsh prince, captured Cilgerran Castle, made an agreement with King John of England, was son-in-law of Lord William de Braose, a Royal favourite who fought in the war against Philip Augustus, 1st King of France
- Maelgwn ap Rhys, Welsh prince, he captured Cardigan Castle, then sold it to King John of England, he then seized Cilgerran Castle but later lost it to William Marshal, 1st Earl of Pembroke
- Anarawd ap Gruffydd, Prince of Deheubarth, joined the war of Prince Owain Gwynedd and his brother Cadwaladr ap Gruffydd, and attacked Cardigan Castle with a Viking fleet against the Normans
- Cadell ap Gruffydd, Prince of Deheubarth, captured Llansteffan Castle and Carmarthen Castle, was attacked and injured by the Normans during a hunt, he left Wales for a pilgrimage to Rome
- Maredudd ap Gruffydd, prince in South-West Wales, fought with his half-brother, Cadell, against the Normans, expelling them from the Kingdom of Ceredigion, he became King after his brother left Wales for Rome
- Rhys ap Maredudd, Welsh prince, was awarded lands by Edward Longshanks, and lived at Dryslwyn Castle, he later rebelled and was executed for treason at York, his son was imprisoned at Bristol Castle
- Rhys Gryg, Welsh prince, fought against Baron Falkes de Bréauté, his wife was the sister of Gilbert de Clare, 5th Earl of Gloucester, a signatory of Magna Carta, his widow remarried to Richard Plantagenet, King of the Romans
- Maredudd ap Rhys Gryg, was in the wardship of Gilbert Marshal, 4th Earl of Pembroke, his aunt was Countess Isabel Marshal, the great-grandmother of Robert the Bruce, King of Scots
- Rhys Mechyll, Welsh prince, married to Matilda de Braose (Deheubarth), his sole heiress married into the House of Talbot and assumed the arms of the House of Dinefwr, she was related to the Royal House of Stuart

== Sources ==
- Jones, Nerys Ann; Parry Owen, Ann, eds. (1995). Gwaith Cynddelw Brydydd Mawr (in Welsh). Vol. 2. Cardiff: University of Wales Press. ISBN 0708312780.
- Siddons, Michael Powell (1991). The Development of Welsh Heraldry. Vol. 1. Aberystwyth: National Library of Wales. ISBN 090715851X.
- —— (1993). The Development of Welsh Heraldry. Vol. 2. Aberystwyth: National Library of Wales. ISBN 090715851X.
