= Rhodri ap Hyfaidd =

King of Dyfed (died 905)

Rhodri ap Hyfaidd (died 905) was briefly the king of the independent early medieval Kingdom of Dyfed in southwestern Wales until he was murdered and his throne usurped.

Rhodri was the son of Hyfaidd ap Bleddri. His brother Llywarch ap Hyfaidd (d. c. 904) is thought to have inherited the kingdom of Dyfed after his father's death in c. 892. After his brother Llywarch was killed by Hywel Dda and his father Cadell, Rhodri reigned briefly before he himself was killed in Arwystli in mid Wales, c. 905, likely as a result of execution following a defeat in battle against Hywel, his father Cadell ap Rhodri, King of Seisyllwg or his uncle Anarawd ap Rhodri, King of Gwynedd. The repeated military attacks of Cadell and Hywel on Dyfed were recorded in Asser's (d. 909) Life of King Alfred, who states Rhodri followed Llywarch as king. Some sources state that Rhodri was killed by strangulation, others that beheading as his cause of death.

Following Rhodri's murder the throne of Dyfed was usurped by Hywel, under whom the kingdom then merged with Seisyllwg to form the kingdom of Deheubarth. Hywel Dda married Rhodri's niece, Llywarch's daughter Elen. Hywel soon consolidated his rule, eventually merging Dyfed with his paternal inheritance as the new kingdom of Deheubarth. Later Welsh tradition held that Hywel inherited Dyfed peacefully through his supposed marriage to Rhodri's niece Elen ferch Llywarch (d. 929) in a manner similar to the stories told about his great-grandfather Merfyn's acquisition of Gwynedd, his grandfather Rhodri's acquisition of Powys, and his father Cadell's acquisition of Ceredigion, all of this despite female inheritance of land having no place in the Welsh law of the period. However, the repeated military attacks of Cadell and Hywel on Dyfed were recorded in Asser's (d. 909) Life of King Alfred, where it states he was replaced by his brother Rhodri.

== See also ==
- Kings of Wales family trees

Regnal titles
Preceded by Llywarch ap Hyfaidd	King of Dyfed; 904–905	Succeeded by Hywel Dda
