= Gabriel Powell =

Welsh priest

Gabriel Powell (baptised 1576–1611) was a Welsh Anglican priest, known for his strident anti-Catholic views.

== Life ==
Powell (the son of the clergyman and historian David Powel) was born in Ruabon, Denbighshire, Wales, and baptised in January 1576. He was educated at Jesus College, Oxford, from 1592 to 1596 and then, after some studying abroad, was appointed to the sinecure position of rector of Llansantffraid-ym-Mechain, Montgomeryshire, Wales. Richard Vaughan, the bishop of London, appointed him as his domestic chaplain in 1605; Powell became rector of Chellesworth, Suffolk, England, in 1606 and ceased to hold the parish of Llansantffraid-ym-Mechain after 1607. In 1609, he was made a prebendary of St Paul's Cathedral, London and in the following year he became the vicar of Northolt, Middlesex.

== Views ==
Powell was a strident anti-Catholic and wrote a number of works condemning the Roman Catholic faith and its followers. His writings included Consideration of the Papists (1604), with warnings of the appalling results that would follow if Prince Henry married a Catholic, and Disputationum... de Antichristo et eius ecclesia (1605) on the Pope as the Antichrist and the Roman Catholic Church as the "synagogue of Antichrist". Whilst this language was condemned in later years by Archbishop Laud, his views were regarded as orthodox at the time and his writings were admired by contemporaries. The Resolved Christian (1600), a treatise on piety, reached its seventh edition by 1617. Other writings were directed against Protestant non-conformists, such as De adiophora (1607), noting the shared beliefs that they held and arguing that divisions between Protestants undermined the fight against Catholics.
