= Owain ap Hywel =

Owain ap Hywel ("Owen son of Howell") may refer to:

- Owain ap Hywel (Glywysing) or Owain ap Hywel ap Rhys, a 9th- & 10th-century king of Glywysing
- Owain ap Hywel Dda or Owain ap Hywel ap Cadell, a 10th-century king of Deheubarth
