= Llywarch ap Hyfaidd =

King of Dyfed from 893 to 904

Llywarch ap Hyfaidd (died c. 904) was a king of Dyfed, an independent kingdom in southwest Wales. He was the son of Hyfaidd ap Bleddri and is thought to have inherited the kingdom of Dyfed after his father's death in c. 892. Sometime soon after Llywarch's death at the beginning of the tenth century, Dyfed became part of the new kingdom of Deheubarth, ruled by Hywel Dda who was married to Llywarch's daughter Elen.

Upon Llywarch's death in 904, the kingdom passed briefly to his brother Rhodri ap Hyfaidd, but he was killed by beheading in Arwystli in mid Wales, likely as a result of execution following a defeat in battle against Hywel, his father Cadell ap Rhodri, King of Seisyllwg or his uncle Anarawd ap Rhodri, King of Gwynedd. Hywel soon consolidated his rule, eventually merging Dyfed with his paternal inheritance as the new kingdom of Deheubarth. Later Welsh tradition held that Hywel inherited Dyfed peacefully through his supposed marriage to Llywarch's daughter Elen (d. 929) in a manner similar to the stories told about his great-grandfather Merfyn's acquisition of Gwynedd, his grandfather Rhodri's acquisition of Powys, and his father Cadell's acquisition of Ceredigion, all of this despite female inheritance of land having no place in the Welsh law of the period. However, the repeated military attacks of Cadell and Hywel on Dyfed were recorded in Asser's (d. 909) Life of King Alfred, where it states he was replaced by his brother Rhodri, although the cause of his death is unknown.

== See also ==
- Kings of Wales family trees

Regnal titles
Preceded by Hyfaidd ap Bleddri	King of Dyfed; 893–904	Succeeded by Rhodri ap Hyfaidd
