= Llywelyn ap Merfyn =

King of Powys

Llywelyn ap Merfyn (died 942) was an early 10th-century King of Powys, son of Merfyn ap Rhodri, and grandson of Rhodri the Great.

Preceded by Merfyn ap Rhodri	King of Powys; 900–942	Succeeded by Hywel Dda ap Cadell
