= List of rulers of Gwynedd =

King list of the medieval Kingdom of Gwynedd

Arms of Llywelyn ap Gruffudd (died 1282)

This is a list of the rulers of the Kingdom of Gwynedd.

== List of kings or princes of Gwynedd ==
=== First Dynasty of Gwynedd ===
- Cunedda (c. 450 – c. 460).
- Einion Yrth ap Cunedda (Einion the Impetuous) (c. 470 – c. 480).
  - Owain Danwyn (Owain Whitetooth) ap Einion (Rhos; late 5th century).
  - Cuneglasus (Rhos) and Saint Einion (Llŷn) ap Owain (late 5th and early 6th centuries).
- Cadwallon Lawhir ap Einion (Cadwallon Long Hand) (c. 500 – c. 534).
- Maelgwn Gwynedd (c. 520 – c. 547).
- Rhun Hir ap Maelgwn (Rhun the Tall) (c. 547 – c. 580).
- Beli ap Rhun (c. 580 – c. 599).
- Iago ap Beli (c. 599 – c. 616).
- Cadfan ap Iago (c. 616 – c. 625).
- Cadwallon ap Cadfan (c. 625 – 634).
- Cadafael, King of Gwynedd (Cadfael the Battle-Shirker) (634 – c. 655).
- Cadwaladr (Cadwallader the Blessed) (c. 655 – c. 682).
- Idwal Iwrch (Idwal the Roebuck) (c. 682 – c. 720).
- Rhodri Molwynog (Rhodri the Bald and Grey) (c. 720 – c. 754)
- Caradog ap Meirion (c. 754 – c. 798).
- Cynan Dindaethwy (c. 798 – c. 816).
- Hywel ap Caradog (c. 816 – c. 825).

=== Merfynion (Second Dynasty of Gwynedd) ===
- Merfyn Frych (825–844).
- Rhodri Mawr (Rhodri the Great) (844–878).
- Anarawd ap Rhodri (878–916)
- Idwal Foel ab Anarawd (Idwal the Bald) (916–942).
- Hywel Dda (Howell the Good) (942–950) (descended from the second son of Rhodri Mawr who ruled in Deheubarth, usurps Gwynedd from the Aberffraw line).
- Iago ab Idwal (950–979).
- Ieuaf ab Idwal (950–969).
- Hywel ap Ieuaf (979–985).
- Cadwallon ab Ieuaf (985–986).
- Maredudd ab Owain (986–999) House of Dinefwr seizes Gwynedd.
- Cynan ap Hywel (999–1005) Returns to the House of Aberffraw briefly.

=== Non-dynastic rulers ===
- Aeddan ap Blegywryd (1005–1018) (minor commote lord usurps Gwynedd from the Aberffraw dynasty).
- Llywelyn ap Seisyll (1018–1023) (Rhuddlan dynasty in lower Gwynedd usurps from Aeddan ap Blegywryd).
- Iago ab Idwal ap Meurig (1023–1039) (Merfynion).

Iago ab Idwal ap Meurig r. 1023–1039
Cynan ab Iago d. 1060
Gruffydd ap Cynan; 1055-1081-1137
Owain Gwynedd; 1100-1137-1170
Hywel ab Owain Gwynedd r. 1170	Iorwerth Drwyndwn; 1145–1174	Dafydd ab Owain Gwynedd; Prince 1170–1195	Maelgwn ab Owain Gwynedd; Prince 1170–1173	Rhodri ab Owain Gwynedd; Prince 1170–1195
Llywelyn the Great; 1173-1195-1240

- Gruffudd ap Llywelyn (1039–1063) (Llywelyn's son Gruffydd usurps from Aberffraw dynasty).
- Bleddyn ap Cynfyn (1063–1075) and Rhiwallon ap Cynfyn (1063–1070) [co-rulers] (Mathrafal dynasty of Powys "receives" Gwynedd from the English King).
- Trahaearn ap Caradog (1075–1081).

=== Second Dynasty of Gwynedd (restored) ===
- Gruffudd ap Cynan (1081–1137) (House of Aberffraw returns). Successfully regained his kingdom against the Norman rule after imprisonment in Chester for over a decade.
- Owain Gwynedd (1137–1170). First of the kings of Gwynedd to style himself as prince in accordance to a treaty with Henry II of England after constant war and internal fractions in Wales. Named Owain the Great.
- Hywel ab Owain Gwynedd r. 1170; killed by his younger brother Dafydd ab Owain in a conspiracy hatched by his stepmother Cristin, dowager princess of Gwynedd, and her sons Dafydd and Rhodri ab Owain.
- Dafydd ab Owain Gwynedd (1170–1195), displaced elder brother Hywel ap Owain Gwynedd, but was himself displaced from Upper Gwynedd c. 1173 ruling only lower Gwynedd until displaced by Llywelyn ab Iorwerth in 1198. England recognized Dafydd as Prince of Gwynedd, though Welsh jurists did not.
  - Rhodri ab Owain Gwynedd (1175–1194, 1194–1195)
  - Maelgwn ab Owain Gwynedd (1170–1173)

=== Princes ===
- Llywelyn ab Iorwerth (Llywelyn the Great) (1195–1240), Prince of Aberffraw, Lord of Snowdon
- Dafydd ap Llywelyn (1240–1246).
- Owain Goch ap Gruffydd (Owain the Red) (1246–1255).
- Llywelyn ap Gruffudd (Llywelyn the Last) (1246–1282).
- Dafydd ap Gruffydd (1282–1283), pretender.

Llywelyn ab Iorwerth (Llywelyn the Great); 1173-1195-1240
Gruffudd ap Llywelyn ap Iorwerth; 1200–1244	Dafydd ap Llywelyn; 1215-1240-1246
Owain Goch ap Gruffydd d. 1282	Llywelyn ap Gruffudd; 1223-1246-1282	Dafydd ap Gruffydd; 1238-1282-1283	Rhodri ap Gruffudd; 1230–1315
Gwenllian of Wales; 1282–1337	Llywelyn ap Dafydd; 1267-1283-1287	Owain ap Dafydd; 1265-1287-1325	Tomas ap Rhodri; 1300-1325-1363
Owain Lawgoch; 1330–1378

== Pretenders ==
- Madog ap Llywelyn (1294–1295) (not crowned but claimed the title).
- Owain Lawgoch (Owain Redhand) ap Tomas ap Rhodri (1372–1378), great-nephew of Llywelyn ap Gruffudd, in exile but claimed the title.

== See also ==
- List of Princes of Wales
- Family tree of Welsh monarchs
- List of rulers of Wales
- House of Gwynedd
- House of Aberffraw
- House of Dinefwr
- House of Mathrafal

== Sources ==
- Bartrum, Peter (1993). A Welsh Classical Dictionary: People in History and Legend Up to about A.D. 1000. National Library of Wales. ISBN 0907158730.
