= Idwal Foel =

King of Gwynedd from 916 to 942

Idwal Foel ab Anarawd
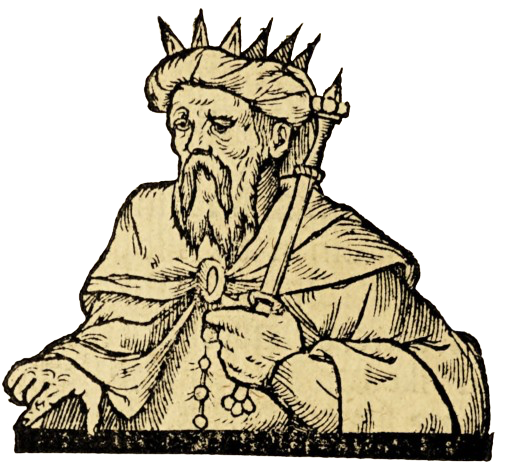
- A fanciful illustration of Idwal from the Historie of Cambria (1584)

King of Gwynedd
- Reign: c. 916 - c. 942
- Predecessor: Anarawd ap Rhodri
- Successor: Hywel Dda
- Died: c. 942
- House: House of Aberffraw
- Father: Anarawd ap Rhodri

Idwal Foel (Idwal the Bald) (died c. 942) or Idwal ab Anarawd (Idwal son of Anarawd) was a 10th-century King of Gwynedd in Wales. A member of the House of Aberffraw, he inherited the throne from his father, Anarawd ap Rhodri. William of Malmesbury credited him as "King of the Britons" in the manner of his father.

== Life ==
Idwal inherited the throne of Gwynedd on the death of his father Anarawd ap Rhodri in 916. His paternal grandparents were Rhodri Mawr, King of Gwynedd and Angharad ferch Meurig of Ceredigion. Idwal allied himself with King Æthelstan of England upon the latter's accession in 924. As Æthelstan was eager to establish his authority across Britain, Idwal honoured him by visiting the English court in 927, 928 and 937. On the first of these visits, he signed charters agreeing to campaign with Æthelstan against the Scots, and marched with Hywel Dda of Deheubarth and Morgan ab Owain of Gwent against Owain ap Dyfnwal, King of Strathclyde that year. Owain was forced to submit to the English king and appear at court by Christmas.

Æthelstan died in 939 and was succeeded by his half-brother Edmund. In 942 Idwal, apparently fearing that the Saxons would support Hywel in usurping him, launched an attack on the Saxons in Wales along with his brother Elisedd. The Annales Cambriæ record his failure: "Idwal and his brother Elisedd are killed in battle against the Saxons". The throne of Gwynedd should have passed to Idwal's sons Iago and Ieuaf, but Hywel Dda invaded and drove them from the kingdom. He reigned for eight years before the brothers were able to return and reclaim their patrimony following his death in 950.

== Children ==
- Meurig whose grandson was Iago ab Idwal ap Meurig;
- Iefan;
- Iago;
- Cynan;
- Ieuaf ("the younger") or "Idwal Fychan" ("little Idwal");
- Rhodri.

== Sources ==
- Powel, David (1584). The historie of Cambria, now called Wales: a part of the most famous Yland of Brytaine, written in the Brytish language aboue two hundreth yeares past. Translated by Llwyd, Humphrey. London: Rafe Newberrie and Henrie Denham. IA historieofcambri00cara.

Idwal Foel House of Aberffraw Born: Unknown Died: 942
Preceded by Anarawd ap Rhodri	King of Gwynedd; 916–942	Succeeded by Hywel Dda
