= David Powel =

Welsh historian and priest

David Powel (1549/52 – 1598) was a Welsh Church of England clergyman and historian who published the first printed history of Wales in 1584.

== Life ==
Powel was born in Denbighshire and commenced his studies at the University of Oxford when he was 16, sometime between 1566 and 1568. Whilst his initial college membership is not known, it is known that he moved to Jesus College when it was founded in 1571. He obtained his B.A. degree on 3 March 1573 and is thought to have been the college's first graduate. He obtained his M.A. on 6 July 1576. Before Powel graduated, he had been named as vicar of Ruabon, Denbighshire and rector of Llanfyllin, Montgomeryshire. He became vicar of Meifod in place of his Llanfyllin position in 1579, and was also the holder of two prebends at St Asaph Cathedral. After further study, he obtained degrees of B.Th. on 19 February 1583 and D.Th. on 11 April 1583. He was then private chaplain to Sir Henry Sidney, Lord President of Wales, from about 1584 to 1586. He died in 1598 in Ruabon, where he was buried. One of his sons was Gabriel Powell, also a clergyman, and a strident anti-Catholic.

== Works ==
Powel made a significant contribution to developing and preserving Welsh culture and to the growth of Protestantism in Wales. He was a supporter of William Morgan's efforts to translate the Bible into Welsh. He kept the Privy Council informed about illegal books circulating amongst Roman Catholics in Wales.

He was a respected scholar and was associated with geographers such as John Dee and Richard Hakluyt. In 1573, Powel took over the task of preparing for publication an English translation (by Humphrey Llwyd) of some medieval Welsh chronicles, upon which John Dee had been working before leaving England. Powel expanded Llwyd's work in its scope and detail, with the help of Lord Burghley providing access to some further documents, making his own contributions clear by typographical distinctions. The resulting publication in 1584, The Historie of Cambria, now called Wales, was the first printed history of Wales. The work remained an important source for medieval Welsh history for several centuries thereafter. It was widely read and shared among Wales' most important early modern scholars, who often commented on their copies depending on their view on Welsh history and contemporary politics. It also popularised the legend that Prince Madoc had discovered America in about 1170, a tale used to justify English encroachments on the territory of Spanish America (for example in Hakluyt's Discourse on Western Planting). Another of his popular stories related to the circumstances of the future King Edward II of England being created Prince of Wales at Caernarfon.

Powel also published a volume with editions of Ponticus Virunnius's Historia Britannica, and Gerald of Wales's Itinerarium Cambriae ('Journey through Wales', 1191) and Descriptio Cambriae ('Description of Wales', 1194), but omitted Gerald's negative comments about the Welsh. The volume was dedicated to Sidney. He is also said (by the later lexicographer John Davies) to have worked on an unpublished Welsh dictionary.
