= Second Dynasty of Gwynedd =

Welsh dynastic family

Second Dynasty of Gwynedd Middle Welsh: MerỼynyaỼn Welsh: Merfynion
- Arms of Llywelyn ap Gruffudd (d. 11 December 1282), one of the most important members of the dynasty
- Parent family: Coeling (alleged, agnatic); First Dynasty (enatic)
- Country: Kingdom of Gwynedd
- Origin: Isle of Man
- Founded: 826; 1200 years ago
- Founder: Merfyn Frych
- Final ruler: Dafydd ap Gruffudd
- Final head: Owain Lawgoch
- Historic seat: Aberffraw
- Deposition: 1283; 743 years ago
- Cadet branches: Cadelling

The Second Dynasty of Gwynedd or Merfynion, sometimes known as the House of Aberffraw, was a dynasty which ruled over Gwynedd with minor interruptions from the ninth to thirteenth centuries. The family was deposed in 1283 with the conquest of Wales by Edward I, which resulted in the execution of the last ruler of Gwynedd, Dafydd ap Gruffudd on October 3 of that year. The final politically active descendant of the main branch of the Second Dynasty of Gwynedd, Owain Lawgoch, was assassinated in July 1378.

Merfyn Frych was the first ruler of Gwynedd not to be a male-line descendant of Cunedda and was therefore not from the First Dynasty of Gwynedd, though his mother Ethyllt was of this line. The dynasty was known after him as the Merfynion, literally 'descendants of Merfyn'. The Dynasty of Deheubarth was a cadet branch of the Merfynion, as it was founded by Cadell ap Rhodri, a grandson of Merfyn Frych.

== Early history ==
The Second Dynasty was established with the conquest of Gwynedd by Merfyn Frych around the year 826. Merfyn was the King of the Isle of Man, and was through his mother Esyllt a grandson of Cynan Dindaethwy, a king of the First Dynasty of Gwynedd. In the 810s, Gwynedd was subject to a civil war between Cynan and Hywel Farf-fehinog, with both claimants representing two different branches of the First Dynasty of Gwynedd, but Cynan died in 816. Gwynedd itself appears to have been a client kingdom of Mercia at this time. Merfyn, as the only recorded grandson of Cynan, was likely supported by Cynan's faction in his conquest of Gwynedd from Hywel, which occurred shortly after Wessex broke Mercian hegemony in England in the Battle of Ellandun in 825.

=== Viking Age ===
Merfyn died in 844, and was succeeded in Gwynedd and Man by his son Rhodri Mawr, after whom the dynasty would branch over Wales. Rhodri himself is an obscure figure in contemporary sources, but is recorded killing Orm, a leader of the Norse Dubgenti in 855, and being driven from Gwynedd by them in 877. The next year, Rhodri recovered Gwynedd, as the Norse had focused their attentions on the conquest of Wessex, but was killed by English forces likely under Ceolwulf later in 878, likely because Ceolwulf sought to reestablish the traditional hegemony by Powys over Gwynedd. By this point, the Merfynion were restricted to Gwynedd, but after the death of Rhodri his sons Anarawd and Cadell broke Mercian hegemony over Wales at the Battle of the Conwy in 881, and subsequently overran the Kingdom of Powys, Kingdom of Ceredigion, and Kingdom of Dyfed in the following decades. Cadell would subsequently found another branch of the dynasty in his conquests in south-west Wales, known as the Cadelling after him.

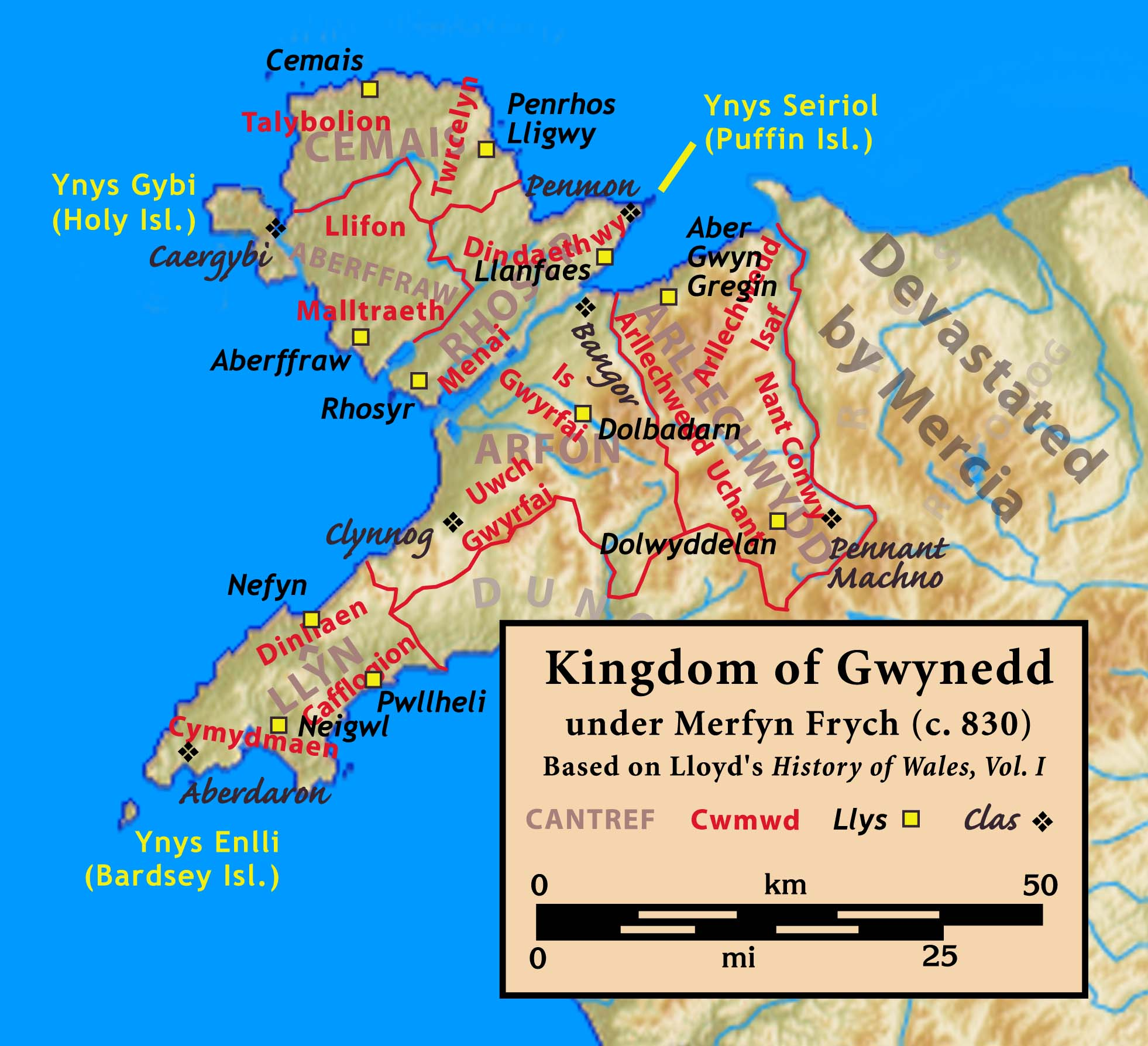
Kingdom of Gwynedd (showing Aberffraw on the Isle of Anglesey) c. 9th century.

The second phase of Viking raids in Wales continued into the 10th century. Between the years 950–998, Wales saw raids, attacks, and slave raids with a devastating Viking raid happening at Aberffraw in 968. King Maredudd ab Owain paid the ransom for the return of Welsh victims of enslavement. Then, the third phase of Viking raids would coincide with the Norman invasion of Wales during the 11th century. This era saw a new alliance between the Vikings and the Second Dynasty through the marriage of Gruffudd ap Cynan's father Cynan ab Iago to the daughter of a Norseman after he took refuge in the Kingdom of Dublin. After several attempts to retake Gwynedd from the Normans, Gruffudd eventually succeeded with assistance from Magnus Barefoot (King of Dublin, King of Norway and King of the Isles) in 1098 when they won the Battle of Anglesey Sound against the English Normans together.

== Power base (Norman invasion) ==
The family were able to assert their influence within Gwynedd, their traditional sphere of influence, but by the 11th century they were ousted from Powys (Mid Wales) and Deheubarth (West Wales) by a series of strong rulers from the House of Dinefwr in Deheubarth, their dynastically junior cousins. The Dinefwr family were descended from the Cadell ap Rhodri, the second son of Rhodri the Great. However, under Gruffudd ap Cynan, the Second Dynasty was able to recover its heritage and position during the Norman invasion of Gwynedd (1081–1100) with Cynan as King of Gwynedd defeating the Norman invaders. Owain Gwynedd, Gruffudd's son defeated King Henry II of England and the vast Angevin host in the 1157 campaign and again in 1166. That led to Owain being proclaimed as the Prince of Wales (Latin: Princeps Wallensium) by other Welsh rulers. The proclamation reasserted and updated the Aberffraw claims to be the principal royal house of Wales, as senior line descendants of Rhodri the Great. (Note: Owain's Welsh position was further reaffirmed in the biography The History of Gruffydd ap Cynan. Written in Latin, the biography was intended for an audience outside Wales.) (Note: The significance of this claim was that the Aberffraw family owed nothing to the English king for their position in Wales, and that they held authority in Wales "by absolute right through descent", wrote historian John Davies.)

After the death of Owain in 1170, his sons descended into fratricidal violence. This may be the origin of the legends of transatlantic travel by Prince Madog.

=== Aberffraw senior line ===
Below is a partial family tree of the dynasty of Gwynedd.

- Gruffudd ap Cynan (c. 1055–1137), King of Gwynedd.
  - Owain Gwynedd (c. 1100 – 28 November 1170), King of Wales = Cristina ferch Gronw ap Owain ap Edwin.
    - Hywel Prince of Gwynedd, King of Ceredigion, c. 1139. (Note: Killed in battle at Pentraeth against his step-brothers Dafydd and Rhodri in 1170 after the death of his father, King Owain Gwynedd.)
      - Caswallon (Note: Caswallon has proven direct male ancestors who exist into the modern day and thereby represent the senior surviving male line of Owain Gwynedd – the genealogy of one family was recorded by Peter Gwynn-Jones, late Garter King of Arms, at The College of Arms.)
    - Iorwerth (died 1174).
      - Llywelyn (c. 1173 – 11 April 1240), Prince of Aberffraw and Lord of Snowdon. (Note: The last of the Llywelyn male line died out with the death of Owain Lawgoch in 1378.)
    - Rhodri (c. 1146–1195), Lord of Anglesey = Annest ferch Rhys ap Gruffudd. (Note: Ancestor of the Anwyl of Tywyn & Wynn baronets families.)

== Llys ==
There were 22 administrative centres (Welsh: Llys/Llysoedd) in the Kingdom of Gwynedd to act as royal courts for the Princes of the Second Dynasty of Gwynedd. Below is an example of a couple of 'Llysoedd':

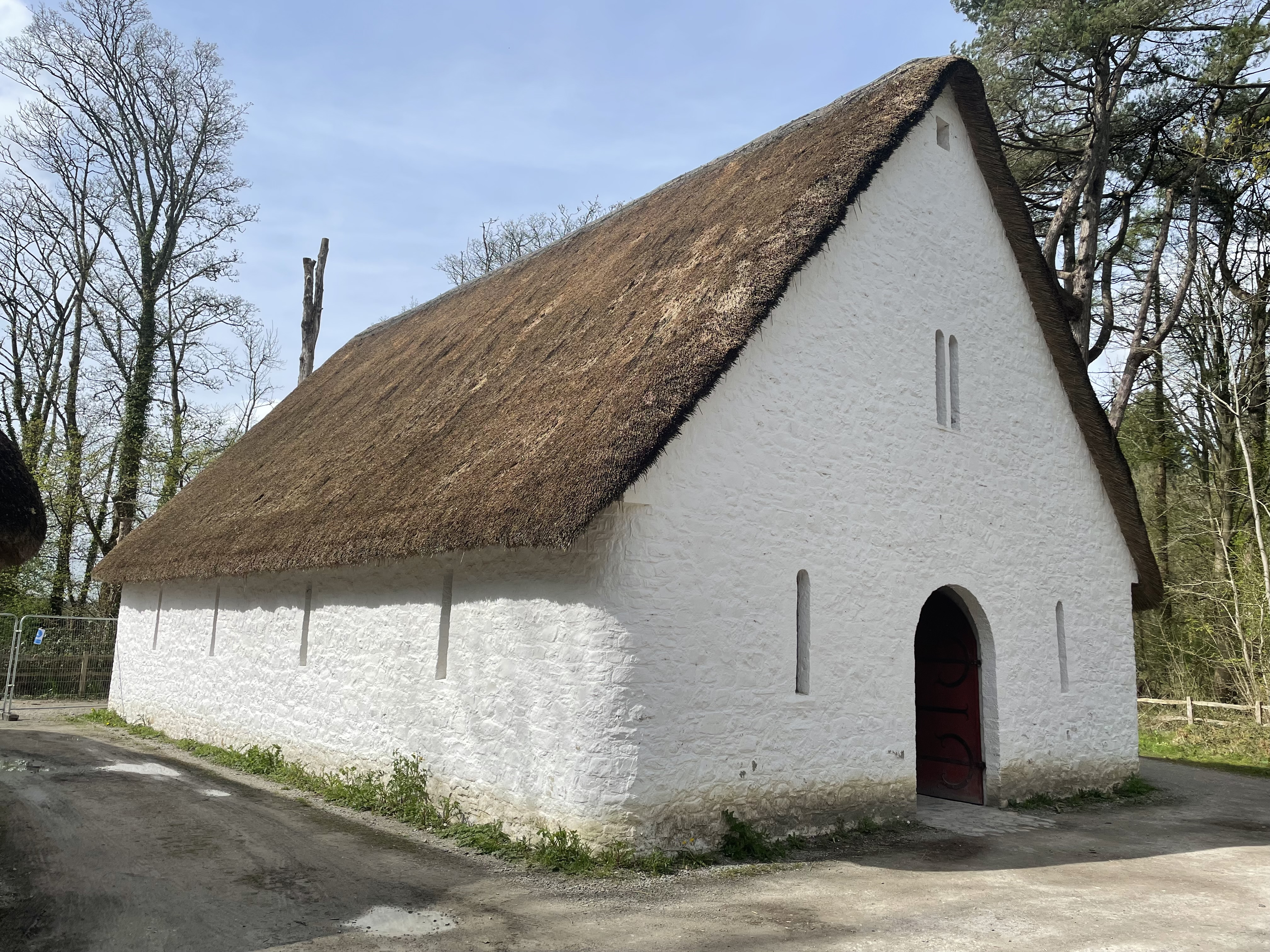
A recreation of a 13th century Venedotian court

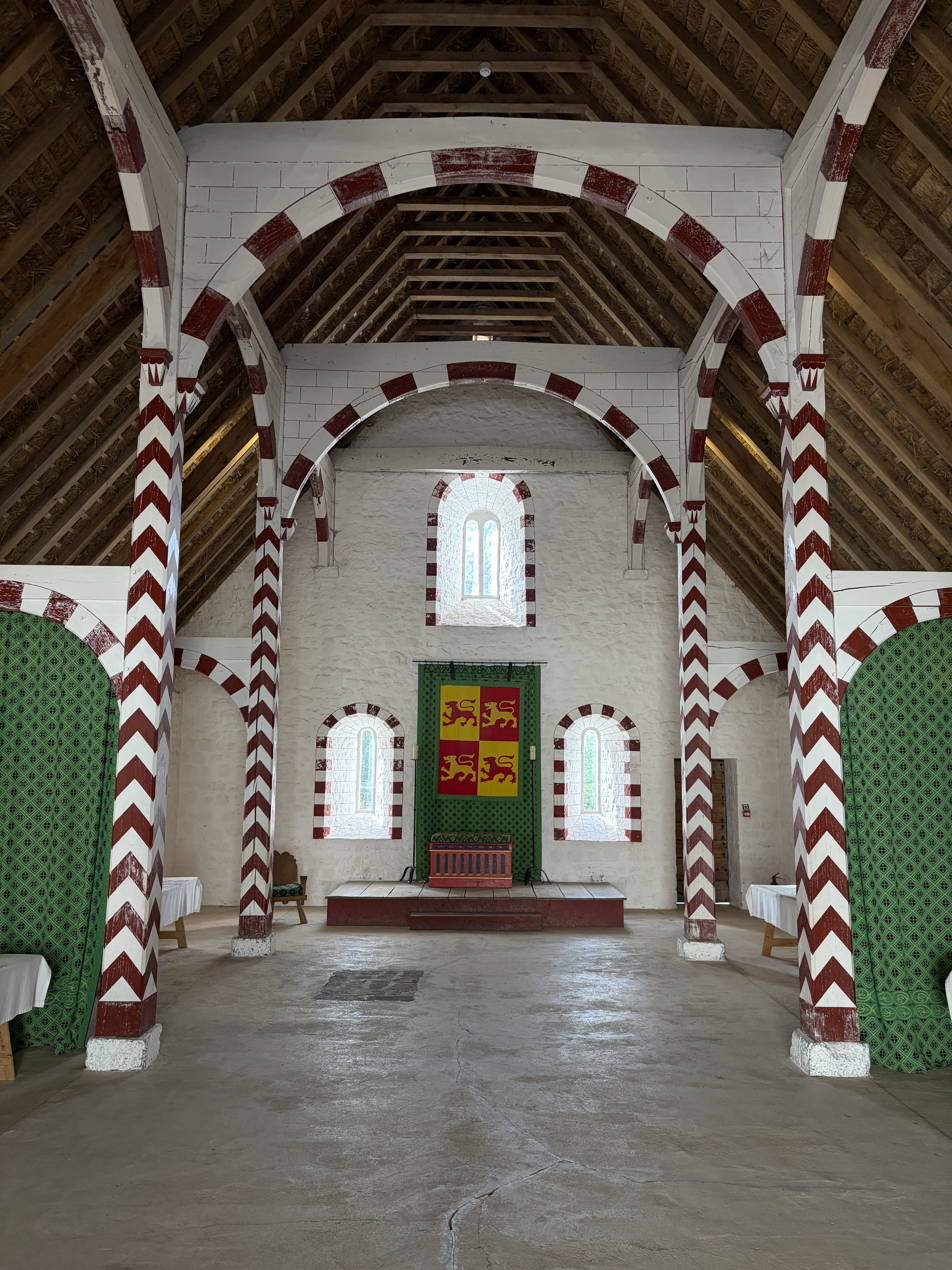
Interior of the court

=== Rhosyr ===
Nearby Aberffraw at Newborough, Anglesey was Llys Rhosyr, where pottery and coins were excavated in the area dating between the years 1247 – 1314. The royal court was built during the reign of Prince Llywelyn and was first recorded on the 10 April 1237. Today a reconstruction is found in St. Fagans Museum in Cardiff, UK.

=== Aberffraw ===
During c. 1200, Prince Llywelyn the Great continued to convene the Royal court at Aberffraw to the high standard of the neighbouring English Kingdom. The Prince's consort was Joan, daughter of King John of England, herself being a Princess who would have entertained court at Aberffraw for Welsh and English royalty. Llywelyn, as Prince, re-edified the rules of the 'royal suite', which were reenacted from the original laws and customs from the year 914 for the Aberffraw Royal Palace. The palace was known as "the chief[e] house of the Prince of Gwynedd" from its foundations during the reign of Rhodri the Great. (Note: The chapter 'Chronicles of the Prince' in the book A History of Mona reveals the order of court life to the full extent.)

"The officers of the household and twelve gentlemen, composed the royal guard, and were mounted on horses, furnished by the king."

There were 35 court positions: The Master of the Palace, The Domestic Chaplain / The Queen's Chaplain, The Steward of the Household / The Steward to the Queen, The Master of the Hawks, The Judge of the Palace, The Master of the Horse / Master of the Horse to the Queen, The Chamberlain / Queen's Chamberlain, The Domestic Bard, The Officer to Command Silence, The Master of the Hounds, The Metheglin (Mead brewer), The Physician of the Palace, The Cup Bearer, The Door Keeper, The Cook / The Queen's Cook, The Sconce bearer / The Queen's Sconce bearer, Woman of the Queen's Chamber, The Door-Keeper to the Queen, The Groom of the Rein, Officer to Support the Prince's Feet at Banquets, The Bailiff of the Royal Demesne, The Apparitor, The Gate-Keeper, The Watchmen of the Palace, The Woodman, The Baker Woman, The Palace Smith, The Laundress, The Chief of Song.

"These were the officers of whom the royal household was composed. They were freeholders by their offices. They received for their wearing apparel, woollen cloth from the prince, and linen from the queen. They were all called together by the palace horn. We have room to infer that Aberffraw was a favourite residence with Llewelyn and his Princess Joan of England"

The setup of the Royal court was vast with a minimum of 47 positions necessary daily, and in some positions, multiple people would be needed. The hall at Aberffraw Palace would have been small, it was Llywelyn ap Gruffudd's room in Harlech Castle which was projected to be the same size as Aberffraw, that is, 15 feet wide and 40 feet long. During 1317, the hall was dismantled, with its timbers being reused in the construction of Caernarfon Castle.

== Princes of Wales (de facto) ==
The Kingdoms of Wales defended their territory from Anglo-Normans and subsequent Kings of England's military expeditions 21 times between 1081 – 1267. It was King Edward I of England who finally suppressed the Welsh Principality after Llywelyn ap Iorwerth (Llywelyn I, the Great) and his grandson, Llywelyn ap Gruffudd (Llywelyn II) had controlled all of medieval Wales. As Llywelyn II was a second son and direct (lineal) descendant of Rhodri Mawr and Owain Gwynedd, his succession caused a number of problems within the Second Dynasty. The 13th century Llywelyns, rulers of Wales controlled their neighbouring Kingdoms through a political framework whilst excluding and subduing the descendants of Norman marcher lords through warfare.

=== Llywelyn the Great ===
By 1203 Llywelyn ap Iorwerth (Llywelyn I, the Great) had followed in the footsteps of his grandfather, Owain Gwynedd, and unified the divided Kingdom of Gwynedd. He further advanced to conquer all of Wales by 1207. King John I of England (Llywelyn's father-in-law) intervened in Powys returning the Kingdom to Prince Gwenwynwyn in 1209, however, the intervention caused a retaliation in the form of the Welsh uprising of 1211. Llywelyn would gain favour from Pope Innocent III who excommunicated King John and encouraged the Welsh Principality to rebel against English rule. After the signing of Magna Carta on the 15th of June 1215, Llywelyn was recognised as not only the Prince of Gwynedd, but as the prince of all Wales not ruled by Normans. In 1216, Llywelyn the Great had received the fealty and homage of the Dinefwr rulers of Deheubarth at the Council of Aberdyfi. Llywelyn became the premier prince in Wales and he acted as Overlord to other nobles. His lands were confirmed in a 1218 meeting in Worcester, England, by the next English monarch, Henry III. By 1230 Llywelyn styled himself as the Prince of Aberffraw and Lord of Snowdon.

=== 1200s – 1400s ===
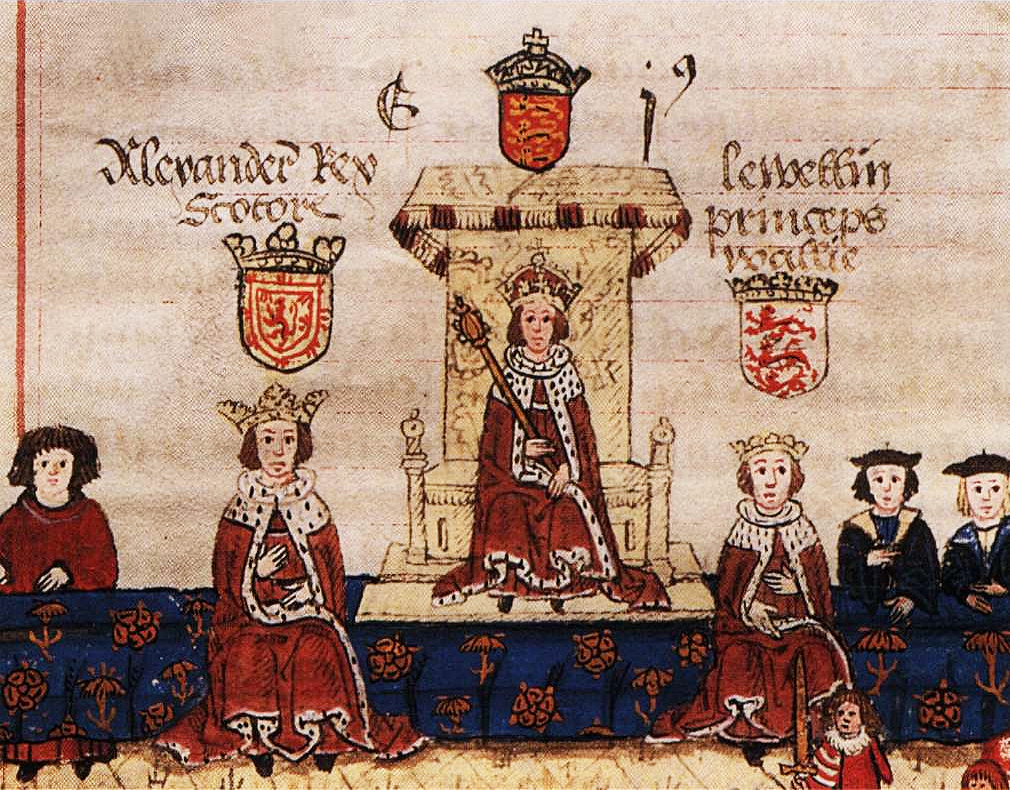
Prince Llywelyn II (right) with the Scottish and English monarchs.

During the 13th century, Gwynedd was ruled by Dafydd ap Llywelyn (Dafydd II), son of Llywelyn the Great, they were served by the family of Ednyfed Fychan, (Note: Ancestor to the Tudors of Penmynydd) who acted as councellors to the princes. After the death of Dafydd II, the power was given to his nephew, Llywelyn ap Gruffudd (Prince Llywelyn II) who was granted the title of Prince of Wales by his English compatriot Henry III at the Treaty of Montgomery during 1267. Prince Llywelyn II was killed in action campaigning for Welsh independence in Cilmeri, December 1282. Of the Aberffraw dynasty the final Prince of Wales was Dafydd ap Gruffydd (Prince Dafydd III). After the death of Dafydd III's brother, the prince himself would be tried for treason and executed in Shrewsbury, England by his once ally Edward I of England on 3 October 1283. The consequences of the 1282–83 Conquest of Wales by Edward I greatly reduced the influence of the family. King Edward I forced the remaining members of the family to surrender their claim to the title of Prince of Wales under the Statute of Rhuddlan in 1284. (Note: The statue also abolished the independent Welsh peerage) The Aberffraw family members closest to Llywelyn II were imprisoned for life by Edward, while the more distant Gwynedd members went into deep hiding and fell into obscurity. Other members of the family did lay claim to their heritage; they included Owain Lawgoch as the lineal successor to Llywelyn II in the 14th century. After the 13th century Princes of Gwynedd had accomplished the title of Prince of Wales very few Welsh noblemen survived the English conquest of 1282/3. Yet from Gwynedd and Merioneth, it was Madog ap Llywelyn who would unsuccessfully start a rebellion in 1294/5, under the title self proclaimed title of Prince of Wales. But another descendant was Owain Glyndŵr, he proclaimed himself as Prince of Wales in 1400 and successfully rebelled against the English Crown during the early 15th century. Several later medieval and early modern Welsh families including the Wynn family of Gwydir and the Anwyl of Tywyn family also claimed descent from Owain Gwynedd.

== See also ==
- First Dynasty of Gwynedd
- Kingdom of Gwynedd
- List of rulers of Gwynedd
- King of Wales
- List of rulers in Wales

== Sources ==
- Bartrum, P. C., ed. (1974). Welsh Genealogies: AD 300-1400. Cardiff: University of Wales Press. doi:10.20391/40837b6f-1887-4afd-9c6e-9b7e3a122693. ISBN 070830561X. Archived from the original on 6 June 2023.
- Charles-Edwards, Thomas (2013). Wales and the Britons, 350-1064. Oxford: Oxford University Press. ISBN 9780198217312. IA walesbritons35010000char.
- Davies, John (1994) [1990]. Hanes Cymru [A History of Wales] (1 ed.). London: Penguin Books. ISBN 0713990988. OCLC 650493756.
- Guy, Ben (2023). "Manaw of the Britons: the Pre-Viking Kings of Man" (PDF). Isle of Man Studies. 18. Isle of Man Natural History and Antiquarian Society: 145–161. doi:10.5284/1050092. Archived from the original (PDF) on 8 August 2024.
- Jones, Nerys Ann; Parry Owen, Ann, eds. (1995). Gwaith Cynddelw Brydydd Mawr (in Welsh). Vol. 2. Cardiff: University of Wales Press. ISBN 0708312780.
- Koch, Thomas (2006). Celtic Culture: a Historical Encyclopaedia. Santa Barbara, US: ABC-CLIO. ISBN 9781851094400.
- Lewis, Hubert (1889). "VIII". The Ancient Laws of Wales. London: Elliot Stock. OCLC 1304160411.
- Lloyd, J.E. (2004). A History of Wales; From the Norman Invasion to the Edwardian Conquest. New York, US: Barnes & Noble Publishing. ISBN 9780760752418.
- Llwyd, Angharad (2007) [1833]. A history of Anglesey. Llyfrau Magma. ISBN 1-872773-73-7. A History of the Island of Mona at Google Books
- Turvey, Roger (2010). Twenty-One Welsh Princes. Conwy: Gwasg Carreg Gwalch. ISBN 9781845272692.
