= Humphrey Llwyd =

Welsh cartographer, politician, author and antiquary (1527–1568)

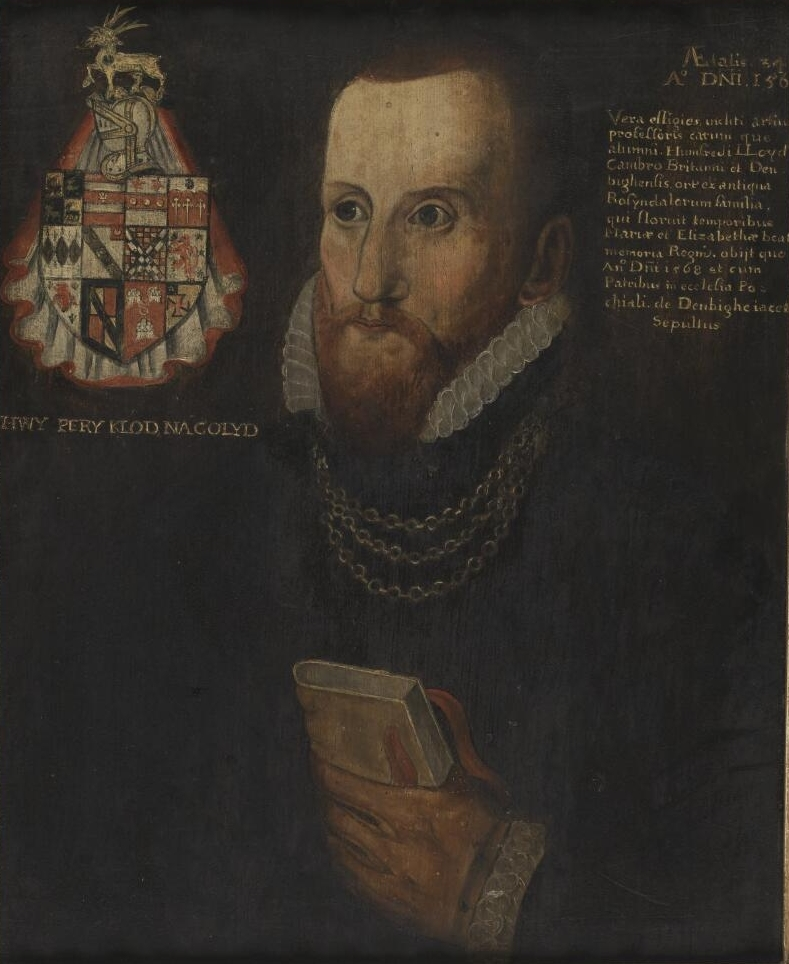
- Born: 1527; Denbigh, county Denbighshire, Wales
- Died: 31 August 1568 (aged 40–41) (O.S.); 10 September 1568 (aged 40–41) (N.S.); Denbigh
- Occupations: Welsh cartographer, author, antiquary
- Office: Minister to Parliament in Elizabeth I's 1st Parliament (1559) and 2nd Parliament (1563)

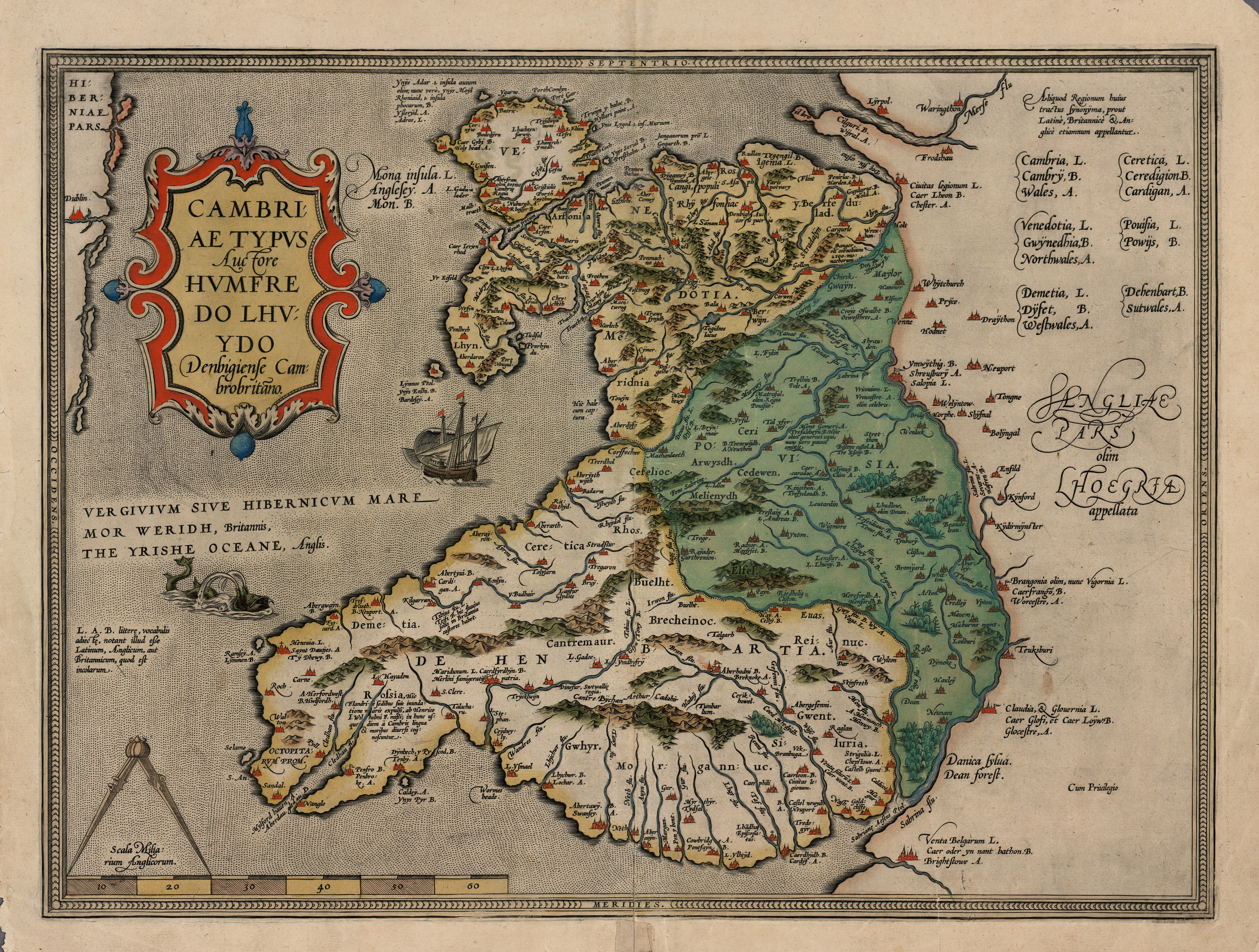
A 1574 version of Humphrey Llwyd's 1573 map of Wales, Cambriae Typus.

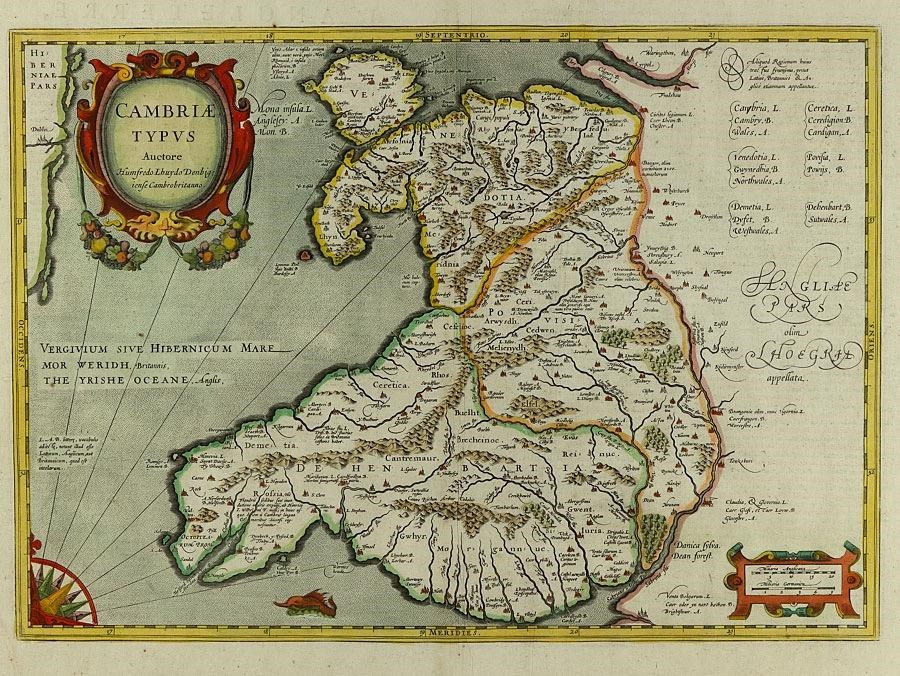
Another version of Humphrey Llwyd's map of Wales, Cambriae Typus, and possibly that of 1573.

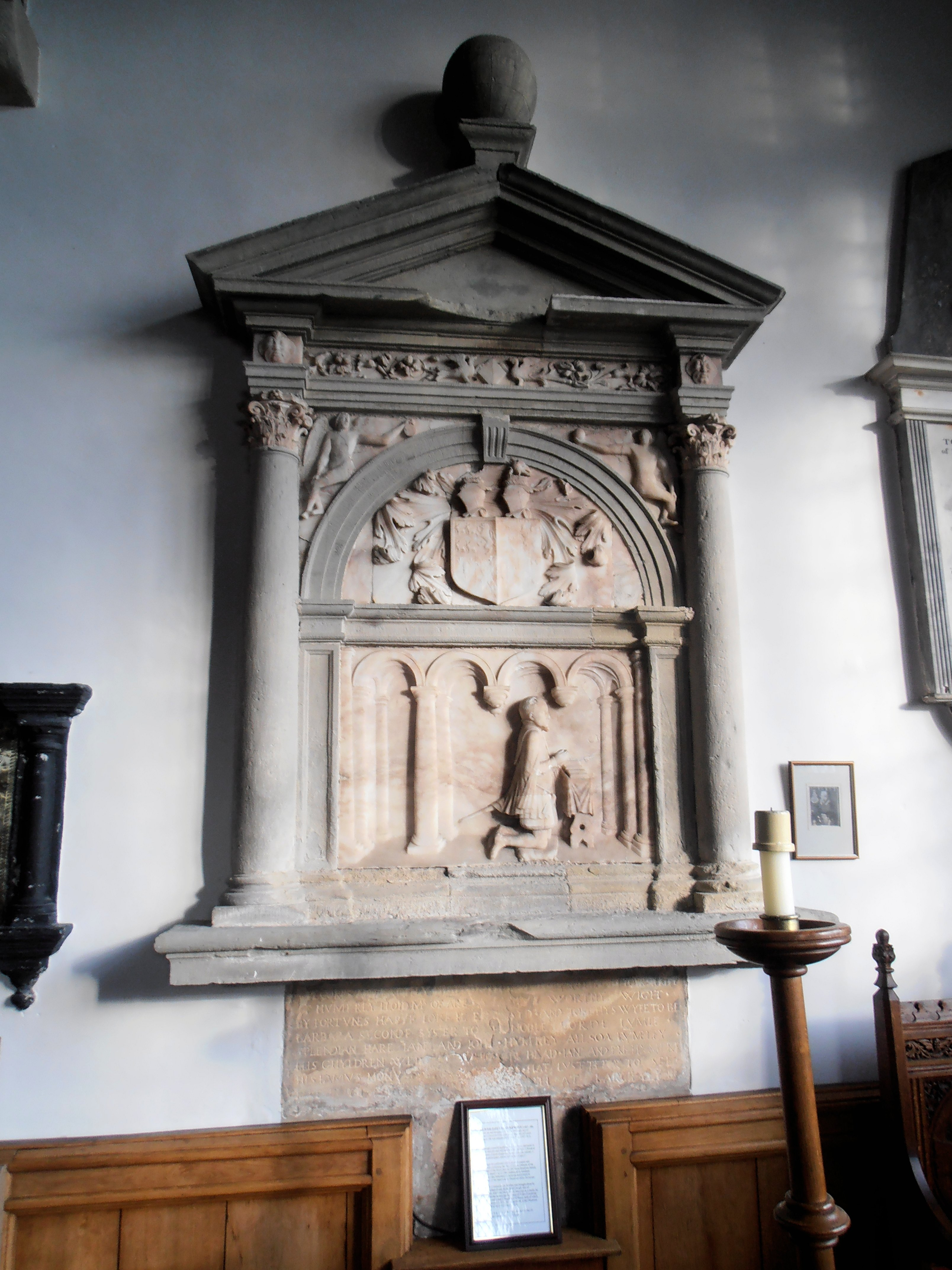
A Victorian-era monument honouring Humphrey Llwyd in St Marcella's Church, Llanfarchell.

Humphrey Llwyd (also spelled Lhuyd) (1527–1568) was a Welsh cartographer, author, antiquary and Member of Parliament. He was a leading member of the Renaissance period in Wales along with other such men as William Salesbury and William Morgan. His library, together with those of his patron, the Earl of Arundel and his brother-in-law, Lord Lumley, formed the basis of the Royal Collection of books; currently housed at the British Library. His motto was Hwy pery klod na golyd ("Fame lasts longer than wealth").

== Life ==
Llwyd was born at Foxhall, his family's estate in Denbigh, the county seat of the then county of Denbighshire. His father, Robert Llwyd, was descended from Harry Rossendale, henchman and grantee of the Earl of Lincoln. The first of the family that came to Wales from England appears to have been Foulk Rosindale, from whom Foxhall, or Foulk's Hall, was called. He married into the family of the Llwyd's of Aston, the probable source where his descendants derived their name, as well as their extraction from Einion Evell of the 12th Century. Einion Evell, Lord of part of Cynllaith, resided at Llwyn y Maen, in the parish of Oswestry. He and his twin brother, Cynwrig Evell, Lord of Y Glwyegl in Maelor Gymraeg, were the illegitimate sons of Madog ab Maredydd, Prince of Powys, by Eva, daughter of Madog (ab Einion Hael) ab Urien of Maen Gwynedd, ab Eginir ab Lies ab Idnerth Benvras, Lord of Maesbrwg.

As a young man, Llwyd was educated at Brasenose College, Oxford and fared so well in the sciences and engineering that he was given a position as a physician to the Earl of Arundel during the Earl's tenure as Chancellor of the university. He was Minister to Parliament for East Grinstead during Elizabeth I's first parliament (1559).

In 1563, Llwyd returned to Denbigh and lived at Denbigh Castle at the permission of Sir John Salusbury who was then the Lord of the Manor of Denbigh. That year, he was elected MP for Denbigh Boroughs during Elizabeth's second Parliament. It has been suggested that he promoted passage of the act requiring the translation of the Bible into Welsh, but no evidence has been found to support that claim.

From 1566 he toured Europe, including Brussels, Augsburg, Milan, Padua and Venice. In Antwerp, he learnt from, and collaborated with, map maker Abraham Ortelius. In 1567, when Llwyd returned to Denbigh, he was given a stipend from the Crown to create the first printed map of Wales for the Dutch geographer Ortelius, for inclusion in his forthcoming Theatrum Orbis Terrarum. Although the map contained inaccuracies, it was nonetheless a pioneer work that proved itself useful into the eighteenth century.

Llwyd did not live to see his map published, however, for he died in Denbigh on 31 August 1568. He is buried in St. Marcella's Church, known locally as Whitchurch or Yr Eglwys Wen in Welsh. The church and cemetery are on the Denbigh outskirts on the road to Llandyrnog.

== Legacy ==
In 2019, Llwyd was the subject of a major exhibition, "Inventor of Britain", at the National Library of Wales, Aberystwyth.

== Works ==
No copy exists of Llwyd's translation into English of Agostino Nifo's De auguriis; Llwyd's other work includes:

- An Almanacke and Kalender, conteynynge, the daye houre, and mynute of the change of the Moone for ever, and the sygne that she is in for these thre yeares, with the natures of the sygnes and Planetes.
- The Treasury of Healthe Conteynyng Many Profitable Medycines Gathered out of Hypocrates, Galen and Auycen (after 23 August 1553 [Julian calendar]), a translation of a work by Peter of Spain (often said to be the same person as Pope John XXI)
- Cronica Walliae a Rege Cadwalader ad annum 1294 (1559 – English adaptation of Brut y tywysogyon)
- De Mona druidum insula … epistola (1568 letter to Ortelius, who published it in Theatrum Orbis Terrarum)
- Commentarioli Britannicae descriptionis fragmentum (1568). Coins the term "British Empire".
- Cambriae Typus (1568), map of Wales published in the Additamentum to Theatrum Orbis Terrarum)
- Angliae regni florentissimi nova descriptio (A map of England & Wales – also published in the Additamentum)

Llwyd also produced two known works in the Welsh language.

== Bibliography ==
- Gruffydd, R. G. (1968). "Humphrey Llwyd of Denbigh: some documents and a catalogue". Transactions of the Denbighshire Historical Society. 17: 54–107.
- Jones, G. Penrhyn (1956). "Humphrey Lhuyd (1527–1568): a sixteenth century Welsh physician". Proceedings of the Royal Society of Medicine. 49 (8): 521–528. doi:10.1177/003591575604900804. PMC 1889097. PMID 13359410.
- Jones, R. Brinley (2014) [2004]. "Llwyd, Humphrey (1527–1568)". Oxford Dictionary of National Biography (online ed.). Oxford University Press. doi:10.1093/ref:odnb/16867. (Subscription, Wikipedia Library access or UK public library membership required.)
- Lloyd, Jacob Youde William (1887). The History of the Princes, the Lords Marcher, and the Ancient Nobility of Powys Fadog. Vol. 6. London: T. Richards.
- Parry, John Humffreys (1824). "Humphrey Llwyd". The Cambrian Plutarch: comprising memoirs of some of the most eminent Welshmen, from the earliest times to the present. London: W. Simpkin & R. Marshall. pp. 299–308. "Humphrey Llwyd."
- Roberts, Iolo; Roberts, Menai (1998). "De Mona druidum insula". In van den Broecke, Marcel; van der Krogt, Peter; Meurer, Peter (eds.). Abraham Ortelius and the First Atlas: essays commemorating the quadricentennial of his death, 1598–1998. Houten: Hes. pp. 347–61. ISBN 9789061943884.
