= Iago ab Idwal =

King of Gwynedd from 950 to 979

Iago ab Idwal Foel
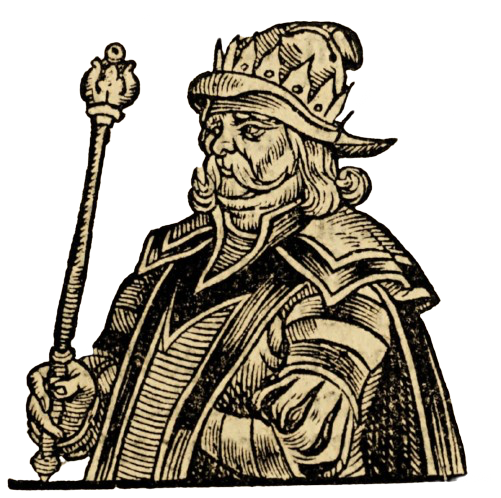
- A fanciful illustration of Iago ab Idwal Foel from the Historie of Cambria (1584)

King of Gwynedd
- Reign: c. 950-979 (deposed)
- Predecessor: Hywel Dda
- Successor: Hywel ap Ieuaf
- Died: c. 979
- Burial: Unknown
- Spouse: ?
- Issue: ?
- House: House of Aberffraw
- Father: Idwal Foel
- Mother: unknown

Iago ab Idwal (fl. 942-979) was a King of Gwynedd (reigned 950–979) and possibly Powys.

Iago was the son of the previous King Idwal Foel who had inherited the throne of Gwynedd on the death of his father Anarawd ap Rhodri in 916. Iago's paternal great grandparents were Rhodri Mawr, King of Gwynedd and Angharad ferch Meurig of Ceredigion. He had at least two brothers, Ieuaf ab Idwal Foel and Meurig ab Idwal Foel.

Idwal had allied himself with King Æthelstan of England upon the latter's accession in 924. Æthelstan died in 939 and was succeeded by his half-brother Edmund. In 942 Idwal, apparently fearing that the Saxons would support Hywel Dda in usurping him, launched a fatal attack on the Saxons in Wales along with his brother Elisedd. The Annales Cambriæ record that "Idwal and his brother Elisedd are killed in battle against the Saxons". The throne of Gwynedd should have passed to Iago and Ieuaf, but Hywel Dda invaded and drove them from the kingdom. He reigned for eight years before the brothers were able to return and reclaim their patrimony following his death in 950. They drove their cousins out of Gwynedd at the Battle of Carno and reclaimed the kingdom. Fighting continued, with the brothers raiding as far south as Dyfed in 952 and their cousins raiding as far north as the Conwy Valley in 954. The southern princes were finally defeated at the Battle of Llanrwst and chased back to Ceredigion.

Having won, the brothers then began to quarrel among themselves. Iago took Ieuaf prisoner in 969 (some sources claim he had him hanged) and ruled another decade, with a brief hiatus in 974 when his nephew Hywel ab Ieuaf invaded and deposed him. Hywel fully usurped him in 979. There appears to be no surviving record of Iago's fate, but his son Custennin Ddu, raided the Llŷn peninsula and Anglesey in 980 in conjunction with Gofraid mac Arailt, king of Man.

== Children ==
Iago had at least one child, and Cystennin ap Iago, also known as Custennin Ddu.

Preceded by Hywel Dda	King of Gwynedd; 950–979	Succeeded by Hywel ap Ieuaf

== Sources ==
- Powel, David (1584). The historie of Cambria, now called Wales: a part of the most famous Yland of Brytaine, written in the Brytish language aboue two hundreth yeares past. Translated by Llwyd, Humphrey. London: Rafe Newberrie and Henrie Denham. IA historieofcambri00cara.
