= Owain Glyndŵr's Court =

Poem by Iolo Goch

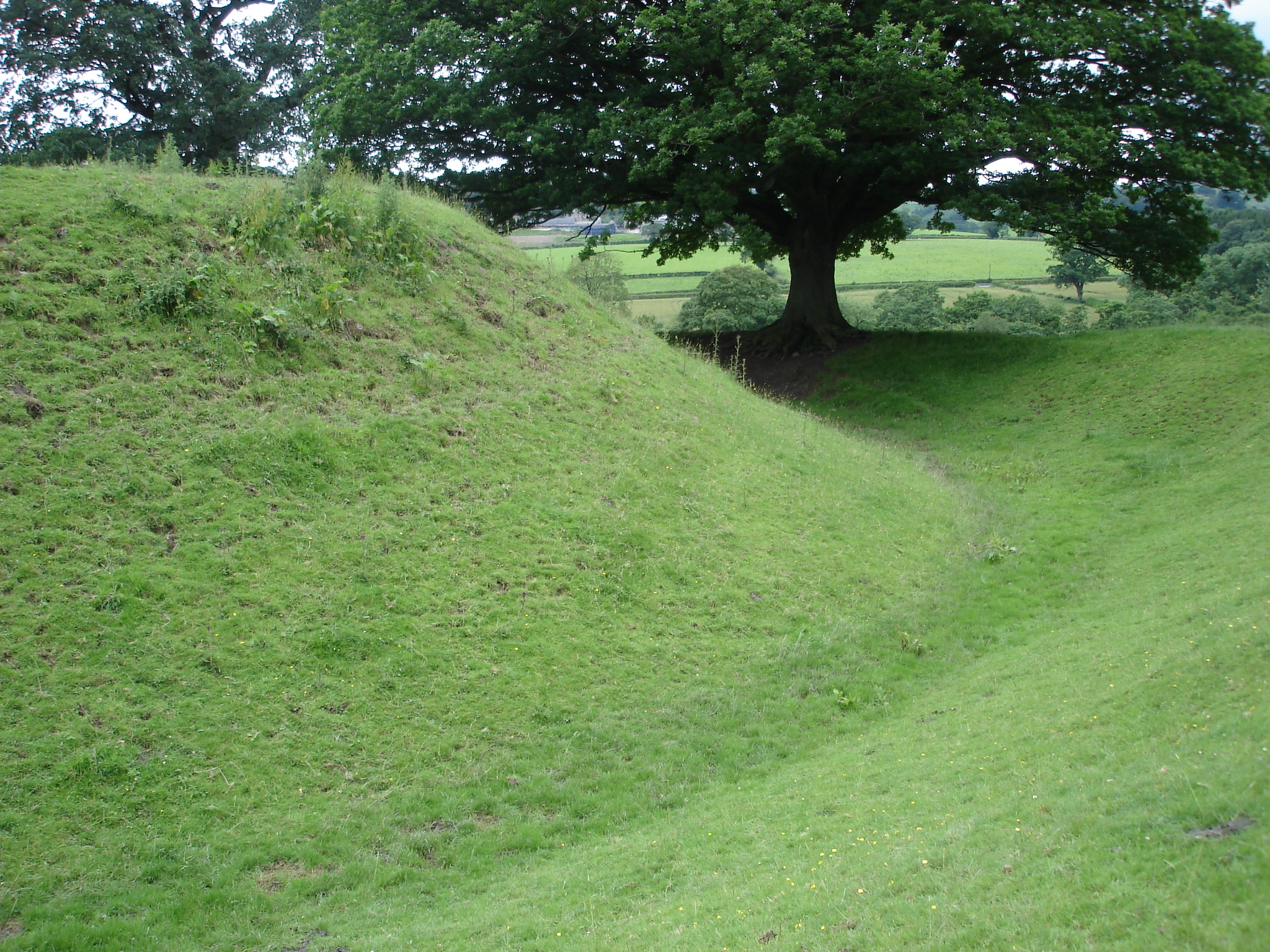
The motte and moat of Owain Glyndŵr's castle at Sycharth

"Owain Glyndŵr's Court" (Middle Welsh: "Llys Owain Glyndŵr"), also known as "Sycharth" or "The Court of Owain Glyndŵr at Sycharth", is a cywydd by the Welsh bard Iolo Goch. It describes and celebrates the hall and household of his patron, the nobleman Owain Glyndŵr, at Sycharth in Powys. It cannot be dated exactly, but was probably written about 1390, before Glyndŵr's revolt against the English crown. It survives in as many as 24 manuscripts.

== Synopsis ==
The poet begins by recalling his promise to visit Owain Glyndŵr's court and announces his intention of honouring it, especially in view of Owain's known hospitality to the old and to bards. He goes on to describe the splendour of the buildings, beginning with the moat, bridge and gate, then singling out for especial praise the symmetry and interconnectedness with which the outer buildings are constructed. He compares them to the bell-tower of Dublin Cathedral and the cloister of Westminster Abbey. His eye is drawn up to the lofts and roofs of the main hall at the top of Sycharth's motte. He describes the cruciform shape of the hall, using the image of a church with chapels, and mentions wardrobes as fine as Cheapside's shops. Then he turns his attention outward to the rabbit warren, deer park, hayfields, mill, dovecote and fishpond. Next come the servants, and the food and various alcoholic drinks they buy for the court. Owain's wife is praised for her nobility of ancestry and conduct, and likewise his children. So free is the hospitality here that there are few locks or latches, and no hunger or thirst. Owain is the best of Welshmen, and his home a splendid place.

== Characters ==
Owain Glyndŵr, who in 1400 went into rebellion against the English crown, was at the period this poem was written a peaceful minor nobleman enjoying his Powys estate. Physically, the poem describes him as a gŵr meingryf, a slim and strong man. Glyndŵr's wife, praised by Iolo as "the best woman of all women...dignified and noble by nature", was Margaret, daughter of a prominent judge, Sir David Hanmer, Justice of the King's Bench. Glyndŵr's children, "a fine nestful of chieftains", included Gruffydd, who was captured and imprisoned during his father's rebellion; Maredudd, who died in the 1420s; Catharine, who married Sir Edmund Mortimer; Alice, who married Sir John Scudamore; Margaret, whose husband's name is recorded as Monington; and Gwenllian, who married Philip ab Rhys of Cenarth. Iolo mentions in passing two of Glyndŵr's remote forerunners, Pywer Lew and Maig Myngfras, both heroes associated with the royal line of Powys, from which Glyndŵr was descended.

== Sycharth ==
Iolo's depiction of the hall and estate has been variously described as impressionistic or almost photographically immediate. He emphasises the resemblance of the hall to recent masterpieces of church-building, and dwells lovingly on its many luxurious features. Yet he values Sycharth not so much as an architectural marvel but as a haven of safety and refinement in a troubled world. In this poem it symbolizes the order and stability of an ideal society, particularly through the poet's imagery of the symmetrical construction of the hall. Such a picture of Sycharth could hardly have been painted during Glyndŵr's revolt, during which it was burned to the ground, nor during the period of discontent which led up to it. The poem was probably written around 1390.

== Use of English ==
As a native of the Denbigh area, where there was much English settlement, Iolo doubtless had some knowledge of the English language. This is confirmed by the large number of English loan-words in his poems. In "Owain Glyndŵr's Court" several of the architectural terms – such as pladd, "plate", and cwpl, "couple" – are taken from English. So also is the word bwrdd in the expression tir bwrdd, "bordland". The critic David Johnston suggests that this is evidence that Iolo had faith in the vitality of the Welsh language, and did not feel it to be threatened by English. Iolo also uses an English street-name when he compares Sycharth's wardrobes to the shops of Siêp Lundain, "London's Cheapside". Other Welsh poets of Iolo's era make similar comparisons, Cheapside being for them the very model of opulence.

== Legacy ==
Gillian Clarke's poem "Sycharth", an evocation of bardic Wales, was included alongside Iolo's poem in a limited edition pamphlet published in 2015 by Gwasg Gregynog. It was reprinted in her collection Zoology (2017).

In 2019, Toby Niesse of the firm Vivid Virtual Reality created a video tour of Sycharth, basing his reconstruction of it on Iolo's poem and his own knowledge of medieval housebuilding techniques.

== Modern editions ==
- Lewis, Henry; Roberts, Thomas; Williams, Ifor, eds. (1937). Cywyddau Iolo Goch ac eraill. Caerdydd: Gwasg Prifysgol Cymru. pp. 36–38.
- Parry, Thomas, ed. (1962). The Oxford Book of Welsh Verse. Oxford: Clarendon Press. pp. 80–83.
- Johnston, Dafydd, ed. (1988). Gwaith Iolo Goch. Caerdydd: Gwasg Prifysgol Cymru. pp. 45–48. ISBN 0708309879.

- Repr. in Johnston, Dafydd, ed. (1993). Iolo Goch: Poems. Llandysul: Gomer. pp. 39, 41, 43. ISBN 0863837077.

== Translations and paraphrases ==
- Jones, Edward (1802). The Bardic Museum of Primitive British Literature. London: pp. p. 57.
- Borrow, George (1915). Welsh Poems and Ballads. London: Jarrold. pp. 27–30. This version was written in Borrow's youth, c. 1820, though only published posthumously.

- Revised version: Borrow, George (1862). Wild Wales: Its People, Language, and Scenery. Volume II. London: John Murray. pp. 392–394.

- Clancy, Joseph P. (1965). Medieval Welsh Lyrics. London: Macmillan. pp. 135–138.
- The Penguin Book of Welsh Verse. Translated by Conran, Anthony; Williams, J. E. Caerwyn. Harmondsworth: Penguin. 1967. pp. 153–156.
- Lloyd, Howel W. (1882). "The poem by Iolo Goch on Owain Glyndwr's palace of Sycharth". Y Cymmrodor. 5: 265, 267, 269, 271, 273.
- Medieval Welsh Poems: An Anthology. Translated by Loomis, Richard; Johnston, Dafydd. Binghamton: Medieval & Renaissance Texts & Studies. 1992. pp. 99–101. ISBN 0866981020.

- Revised version: Johnston, Dafydd (1993). Iolo Goch: Poems. Llandysul: Gomer. pp. 38, 40, 42. ISBN 0863837077.

- Penberthy, David (June 2010). Owain Glyndŵr and His Uprising – Interpretation Plan (PDF) (Report). Siân Shakespear. pp. 63–66. Abridged translation.
- Watson, Giles (2016). Rivals of Dafydd ap Gwilym: A Treasury of Fourteenth and Fifteenth Century Welsh Verse. npp: pp. pp. 36–39. ISBN 9781326900458.
