= Gruffudd Fychan (died before 1370) =

Lord of Glyndyfrdwy and Lord of Cynllaith Owain

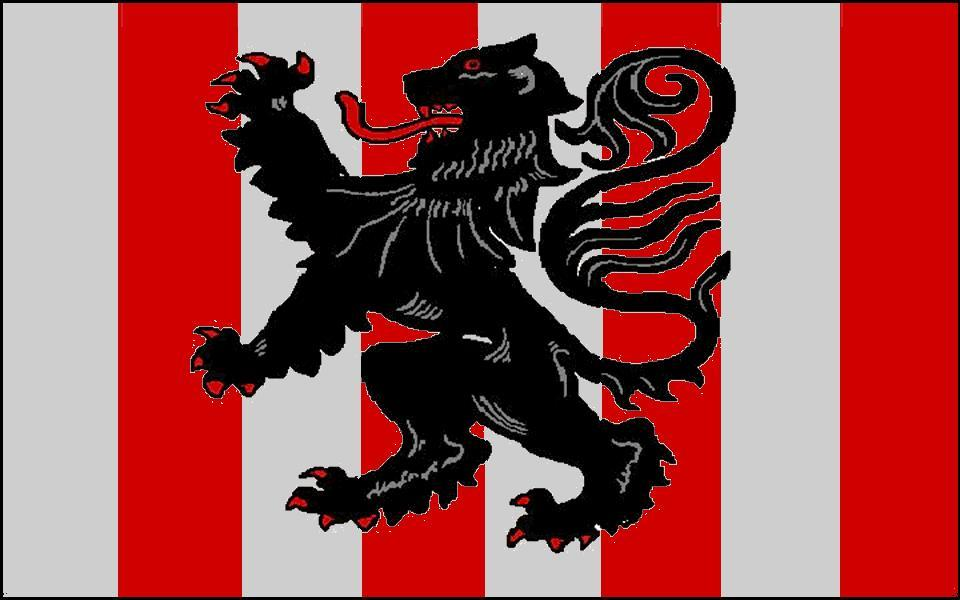
Coat of arms of Glyndyfrdwy, from which Gruffudd Fychan inherited the barony and estates

Gruffudd Fychan (c.1330–1369) was Lord of Glyndyfrdwy and Lord of Cynllaith Owain. As such, he had a claim to be hereditary Prince of Powys Fadog, and was a member of the Royal House of Mathrafal. His son, Owain Glyndwr, started the Welsh Revolt and became Prince of Wales.

He was the Steward of the lordship of Oswestry and keeper of the lordship of Ellesmere for Richard Fitzalan, 4th Earl of Arundel.

== Ancestry ==
Gruffudd Fychan was the son of Gruffudd of Rhuddallt and Elizabeth Lestrange, daughter of John le Strange, 1st Baron Strange of Knockyn. His paternal grandfather was the hereditary prince Madog Crypl of Powys Fadog, son of prince Gruffudd Fychan I. Both his father and grandfather were also the Barons of Glyndyfrdwy and Cynllaith Owain in Powys Fadog, once held in its entirety by his ancestor, prince Gruffydd Maelor II. Gruffudd's aunt was Countess Alice de Lacy of Pontefract Castle, the widow of Thomas, 2nd Earl of Lancaster, member of the royal House of Lancaster, and one of the richest men of his time.

His great-granduncles were crusader Hamo le Strange, who was protected by the Sultan of Egypt Baybars; he was also married to the Queen of Cyprus, Isabella, of the House of Ibelin, while the other was Roger le Strange, Baron Strange, who was a royal advisor to king Edward I of England, and Constable of Castle Dinas Bran, Gruffudd's family ancestral seat. His great-grandaunt, Lady Hawise, married his third cousin, prince Gruffudd ap Gwenwynwyn, member of the House of Mathrafal and builder of Powis Castle.

== Marriage ==
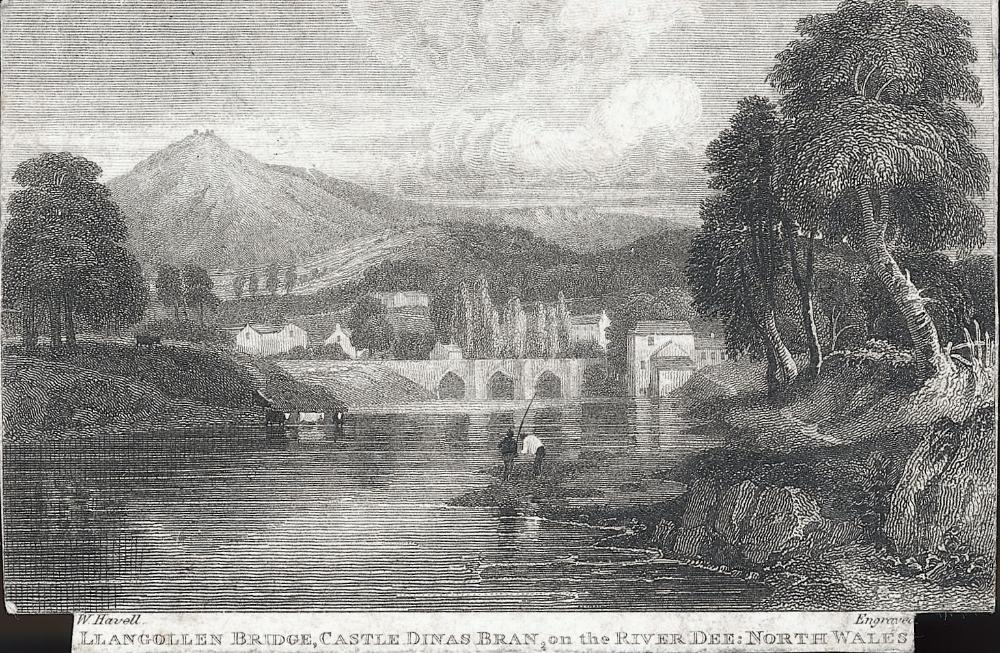
Plas Newydd, near Llangollen, in Denbighshire, with Powys Fadog's Castell Dinas Bran at the top of the hill

Gruffudd Fychan was married to Elen (Eleanor), reputedly great-granddaughter of Eleanor Plantagenet, the daughter of King Edward Longshanks and Queen Eleanor of Castile, members of the Royal House of Plantagenet and Ivrea. Through her great-great-great-grandmother, Queen Eleanor of Provence, she was a descendant of Frozza Orseolo, member of the Venetian House of Orseolo, which included Orso Ipato, the first Doge of Venice historically known.

Elen's father, Thomas ap Llywelyn, Representative of the last sovereign Princes of South Wales, was Lord of South Wales. Elen's sister, Marged ferch Tomos, became the wife of Tudur ap Goronwy, of the Tudors of Penmynydd, and the grandmother of Sir Owen Tudor, who gave his name to the House of Tudor.

Her father's cousins included Eleanor (died 1332), who married to Rudolph, Duke of Lorraine, son of Elisabeth of Habsburg. Their son and grandson married with the House of Este and the House of Visconti, through the powerful Lord of Milan, Bernabò Visconti.

Her grandmother, Eleanor of Bar, was a niece of Isabelle of Lorraine and Matthias of Lorraine, members of the House of Habsburg-Lorraine. Through Robert II, Duke of Burgundy, and Princess Agnes of France, Eleanor's in-laws included the Royal families of Edward, Count of Savoy, of the House of Savoy, King Louis X of the House of Capet, and King Philip VI of the House of Valois, among others.

== Children ==
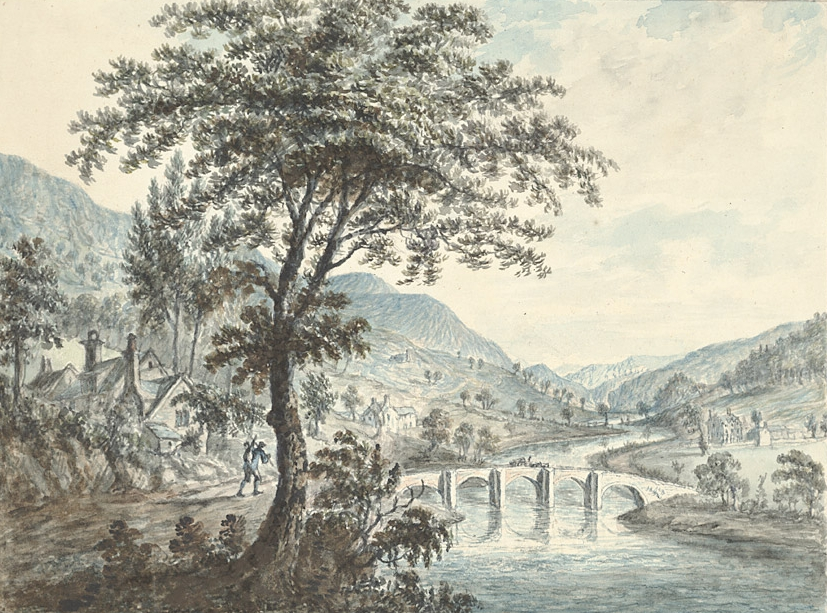
View towards Llansanfraid Bridge in Glyndyfrdwy in Wales

Gruffudd Fychan and Elen (Eleanor) had issue:

- Madog, died young
- Owain ap Gruffudd, later known as Owain Glyndŵr, proclaimed Prince of Wales and leader of the Welsh Revolt in September 1400 which lasted to 1412 or 1416. He married Margaret Hanmer, daughter of Sir David Hanmer and had issue. Their daughter Catrin married Sir Edmund Mortimer, member of the Royal family of England. His great-uncle was prince John of Gaunt, son of King Edward of Windsor.
- Lowry, married Robert Puleston, and had issue. Their son Roger became Deputy Constable of Denbigh Castle to Jasper Tudor, Duke of Bedford, member of the House of Tudor. Jasper Tudor was his first cousin.
- Isabel ferch Gruffudd, married Adda ap Iorwerth Ddu, and had issue.
- Gruffudd
- Tudur ap Gruffudd, Lord of Gwyddelwern, was a leader and Commander in the Welsh Revolt against Henry V and his father, members of the House of Lancaster.

The children of Gruffudd Fychan and Elen were all first cousins of Sir Owen Tudor, Edmund Tudor, 1st Earl of Richmond, Jasper Tudor, Duke of Bedford, and the first Tudor monarch, King Henry VII of England.

== Death ==
He was buried at the Church of St. Asaph & St Cyndeyrn in Llanasa where the remains of his tomb can be seen today.
