= Tudur ap Gruffudd =

Member of the Welsh Lleision

Shield of the Lord of Gwyddelwern, featuring the Black Lion of Powys

Tudur ap Gruffudd (1365–1405), also known as Tudor de Glendore or Tudor Glendower, was the Lord of Gwyddelwern, a junior title of the princely house of Powys Fadog, and was the younger brother of Owain Glyndŵr. His father was Gruffydd Fychan II, the hereditary Prince of Powys Fadog and previous Lord of Gwyddelwern. Along with his brother, Owain Glyndŵr, Tudur was a member of the royal House of Mathrafal.

He joined his brother's rebellion for the independence of Wales and was the commander at the Battle of Pwll Melyn with his nephew Gruffudd. He was slain in 1405 after a loss of more than 1,500 men against the army of Prince Henry, the future Henry V of England.

== Early life ==
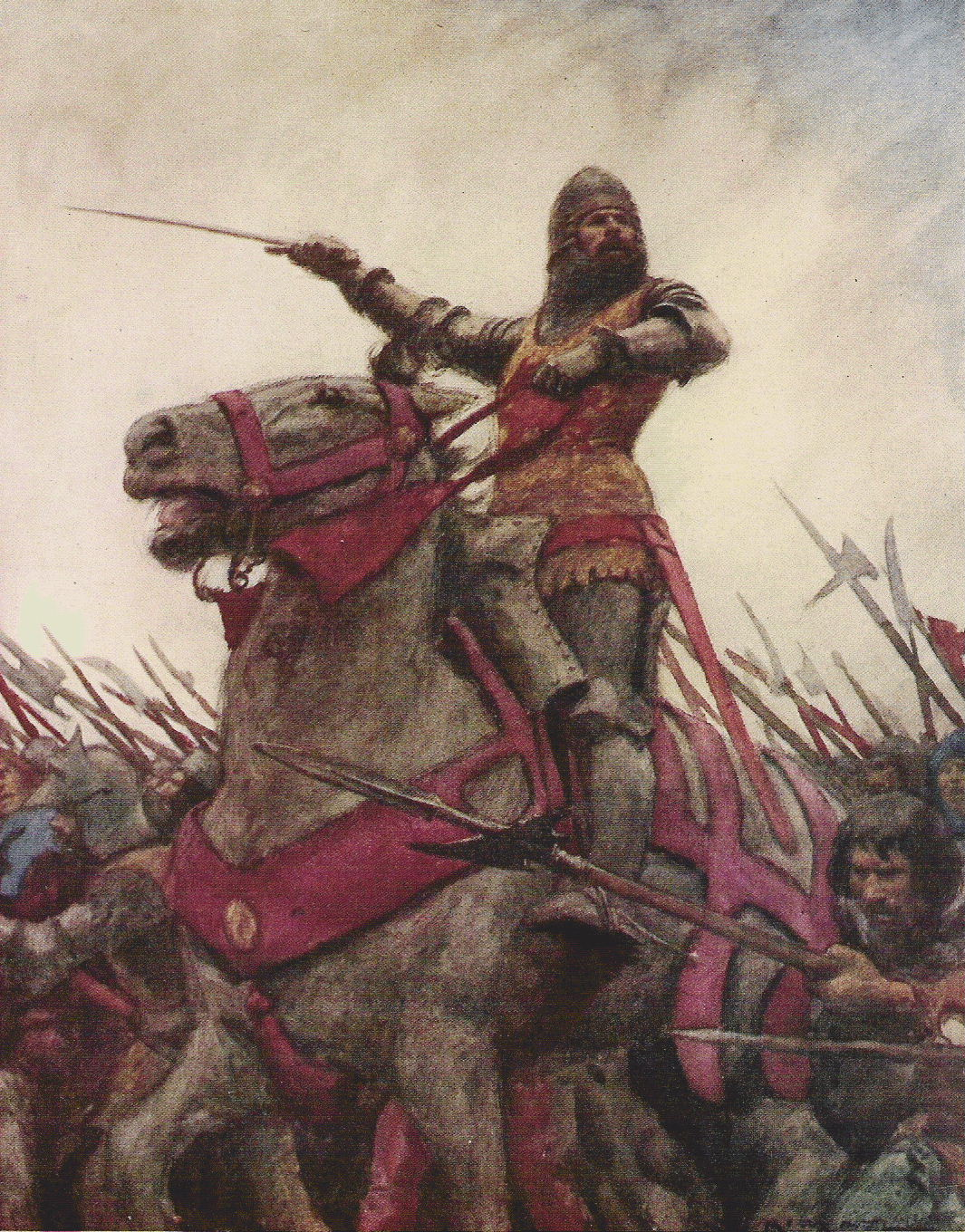
Glyndŵr rebellion, Anglo-Welsh war of independence

Tudur was raised at Sycharth, the family seat of his father, and was tutored in Welsh, English, French and Latin. His father died before 1370 when he was still a child. His family owned estates in North Wales and South Wales and were the richest family among the Welsh lords of royal descent who had retained a small part of their former patrimony. His father, Gruffydd Fychan II, was previously the Steward of the lordship of Oswestry and keeper of the lordship of Ellesmere for Richard Fitzalan, 4th Earl of Arundel, who held the Lordship of Bromfield and Yale.

The latter was the former territory of Tudur's ancestors when they were the Princes of Northern Powys at Castle Dinas Bran before the Conquest of Wales by Edward I in 1282. Tudur's grandmother was a member of the LeStranges, a family of Norman Marcher Lords who rose in power as supporters of Edward I of England. Tudur's grandaunt was the Countess Alice de Lacy of Pontefract Castle, the widow of Thomas, 2nd Earl of Lancaster, member of the royal House of Lancaster, and one of the richest men of his time.

Tudur then entered the army of King Richard II of England on March 1384, with his brother Owain, and his future brother-in-law John Hanmer, as one of the squires of the Welsh knight Sir Gregory Sais. They were part of the garrison at Berwick-upon-Tweed in Northumberland, on the Anglo-Scottish border, which was part of the Hundred Years' War against the French. The Welsh bard Crach Finnant served with them in Scotland.

In 1387, Tudur and his brother became members of the personal retinue of Richard Fitzalan, 4th Earl of Arundel. The Earl was the Admiral of the North and Western Fleets, which consisted of 60 warships and 3,000 men. The brothers' roles as squires during the expedition ended after the Battle of Margate. Despite many of Arundel's squires were knighted by King Richard II of England, the Glyndwr brothers were not knighted.

== History ==
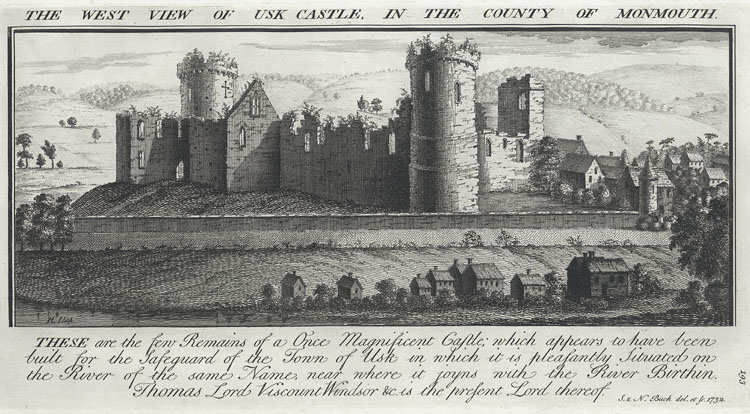
Ruins of Usk Castle, near the Battle of Pwll Melyn, commanded by Tudur and his nephew

Around 1400, as a military commander, Tudur joined the rebellion led by his brother Owain Glyndŵr, fighting with him, his nephews, and extended family such as the Tudors of Penmynydd, Sir Edmund Mortimer, and Sir Henry "Hotspur" Percy of the House of Percy, for the independence of Wales and the conquest of England. These last two, and Owain, together signed the Tripartite Indenture, an agreement that would split England and Wales in three separate kingdoms between themselves after removing from power the King of England, Henry IV. Tudur was among the 300 initial followers, which included the Dean of St Asaph, who proclaimed on September 16, 1400, his brother as Prince of Wales.

From a court in Oswestry on October 6, 1400, the Crown of England formally accused Tudur, his brother Owain, his brother's prophet Crach Ffinnant, the Hanmers and a few others, of "Treasonably plotting, conspiring and intending the death and disinheriting of the said Lord King (Henry IV) and the everlasting extinction of the said crown and regality of himself and all of his successors, the kings of England; the death of Henry, Prince of Wales, the first born son of our said king, of all the magnates and nobles of England; and also the death, destruction and the everlasting extinction of the whole English language".

A few months later, Tudur commanded an army with his nephew, Gruffudd ab Owain Glyndŵr, during the rebellions, and fought against Prince Henry, known through Shakespeare as Prince Hal, the future King Henry V of England and victor of the Battle of Agincourt. They launched an attack on Usk Castle, trying to capture it after the burning of the town of Usk by Owain. The assault was repulsed and they retreated to the North with their army. They were then pursued by the troops commanded by Richard Grey, 1st Baron Grey of Codnor, Dafydd Gam, and Sir John Oldcastle, the future namesake of John Falstaff by Shakespeare.

=== Downfall ===
Tudur and Gruffudd later suffered a colossal defeat of 1,500 deaths at the Battle of Pwll Melyn, with Tudur being killed in front of the castle, while his nephew captured and sent to the Tower of London, becoming a prisoner with the young King James I of Scotland. Gruffudd was imprisoned there for six years before dying in prison, most likely from plague. After the battle, Tudur's body was found and decapitated by the English, with his head cut and presented to the commanders. They initially mistaken him for his brother Owain, which made them send a report about Owain's death, confusing the army, but after examining the eyes, they discovered their mistake. His head was publicly exhibited across London. While Tudur had initially accepted a pardon from the King in 1401, after being accused of high treason, he had reverted to his brother's side. His other nephews and cousins would also be mercilessly put to death or taken as prisoners by the House of Lancaster.

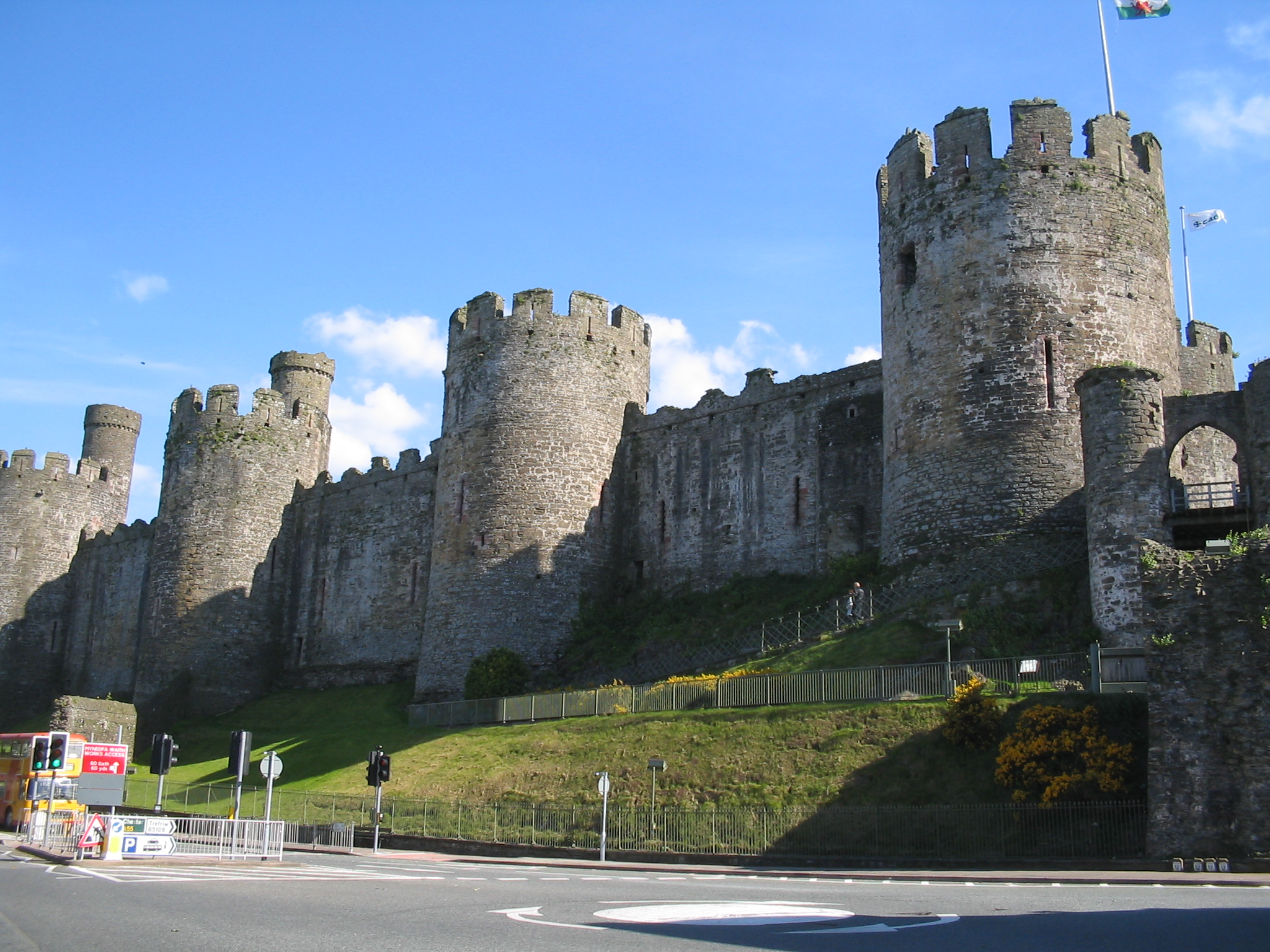
Conwy Castle

Among Tudur's cousins who fought with him during the Glyndŵr rebellion were Gwilym ap Tudur and Rhys ap Tudur, who famously seized Conwy Castle, and Maredudd ap Tudur, the father of Sir Owen Tudor, of the future royal House of Tudor. Having lost the war but being spared, Sir Owen fled Wales to establish himself in England, and anglicized his name from Tudur to Tudor. He was Tudur ap Gruffudd's first cousin. He later became the father of Jasper Tudor, Duke of Bedford and Edmund Tudor, 1st Earl of Richmond, and thus became the grandfather of King Henry VII, founder of the Tudor Dynasty.

Having married the previous wife of King Henry V of England, against whom his family and cousins were fighting during the rebellions, such as Tudur and Owain, he ended up becoming the stepfather of his son, King Henry VI of England, of the House of Lancaster, while his own sons, Jasper Tudor and Edmund Tudor, ended up being his half-brothers. This would later be influential for the cousins of Tudur, the remaining Tudors of Penmynydd, to gain back some of their influence in Wales, by having their cousins on the throne of England.

== Ancestry ==
Through his mother, Elen ferch Tomos, wife of Prince Gruffudd Fychan II, Tudur was a descendant of the Prince of Wales, Llywelyn ap Gruffudd (died 1282), and of his wife, Princess Eleanor de Montfort. Llywelyn was the grandson of Prince Llywelyn ab Iorwerth, the grandfather of Isabella of Mar, wife of Robert the Bruce, King of Scotland, and grandmother of Robert II, founder of the Royal House of Stuart. Eleanor, on her side, was the granddaughter of King John of England of the Royal House of Plantagenet, and of his wife, Queen Isabelle of Angouleme, the granddaughter of King Louis VI of France of the Royal House of France, and niece of Peter of Courtenay, Emperor of Constantinople.

King John had, as his brother, the famous Richard the Lionheart, while his children were respectively Richard, King of the Romans, Henry, King of England, Joan, Queen of Scotland, as well as Isabella, Holy Roman Empress, Queen of Italy and Queen of Germany. Through the Princes of Deheubarth, such as Lord Rhys, Tudur was a descendant of the Royal House of Aberffraw as well. During the war of independence, some of these royal lineages were used to gain support for his family and his brother Owain, to legitimize their claim to the throne of Wales, as well as gaining support from the Kingdom of France, through the House of Valois.

== Tudor de Glendore ==
Tudur was also recorded to be present as a witness, under the name Tudor de Glendore, along with his brother Owain Glyndŵr, Prince John of Gaunt, Duke of Lancaster, and many others, at the Scrope v Grosvenor trial of 1389, a High Court of Chivalry case that was presided by the Constable of England, Prince Thomas of Woodstock, Duke of Gloucester.

== Legacy ==
In terms of legacy, despite having lost the war of independence of Wales, the Glyndŵr rebellion gave rise to the royal House of Tudor, the first Welsh kings of England. This historic period would later be immortalized in William Shakespeare's plays, Henry IV, Part 1 and Henry IV, Part 2, through the character of Tudur's brother, "Owen Glendower", and much later, on the Flag of Wales, by having the red dragon used by Owain Glyndŵr and King Henry Tudor during their rebellions. Many poems and books were also written during this period, to glamorize the Glendowers as legendary symbols of Welsh nationalism.

== Descendants ==
Lord Tudur ap Gruffudd married to Maud, daughter and heiress of Ieuaf ab Adda, a descendant of Tudor Trevor, Lord of Hereford and Whittington. They had a daughter and sole heiress named Lowry. She married first to Robin ab Gruffydd, Lord of Rhos, by whom she had a son named David, then secondly, to Gruffydd ab Einion, by whom she had a second son named Ellis ap Griffith, born in 1440. He became Baron of Gwyddelwern and married Margaret, daughter of Jenkyn ap Ievan of Allt Llwyn Dragon (Plas-yn-Yale), and was a cousin of Jasper Tudor, Duke of Bedford and Edmund Tudor, 1st Earl of Richmond, members of the House of Tudor.

One of Elissau's cousins and two of his grandsons served under the Tudors. Roger Puleston, son of Robert Puleston, held Denbigh Castle for Jasper Tudor during the War of the Roses, as his Deputy Constable. Roger Lloyd Yale served as Secretary to Cardinal Thomas Wolsey, the chief minister of Henry VIII, and Thomas Yale served as Chancellor to Archbishop Edmund Grindal, the head of the Church of England for Elizabeth I. Chancellor Thomas Yale became the great-great-granduncle of Governor Elihu Yale who gave his name to Yale University. The great-grandfather of Tudur, Prince Gruffudd Fychan I, was the Lord of Yale and ancestor of the House of Yale (Yale family).
