= Princess of Wales =

British royal family title

- Tywysoges Cymru (Welsh)
- Arms of Catherine, Princess of Wales

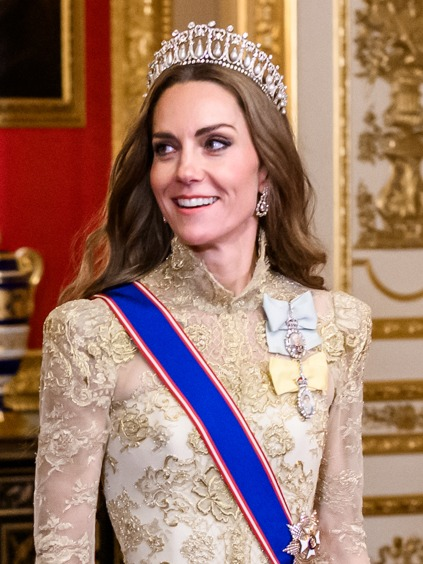
- Incumbent; Catherine since 9 September 2022
- Style: Her Royal Highness
- Member of: British royal family

Princess of Wales (Welsh: Tywysoges Cymru; Latin: Principissa Cambriae/Walliae) is a title used since the 14th century by the wife of the Prince of Wales. The Princess is the apparent future queen consort, as "Prince of Wales" is a title reserved by custom for the heir apparent to the British throne, and earlier the English throne. The current title-holder is Catherine (née Middleton).

When the title was first recorded it was not connected to the English throne; it developed in an independent Wales when it was held by Eleanor de Montfort, wife of the native Prince of Wales Llywelyn ap Gruffydd.

== Background ==
Prior to "Princess" (Welsh: Tywysoges) the title of "Queen" (Welsh: Brenhines) was used by some spouses of the rulers of Wales. Examples are Angharad ferch Owain, wife of Gruffudd ap Cynan, and Cristin verch Goronwy, wife of Gruffudd's son, Owain Gwynedd (specifically, she was known as "Queen Dowager").

== The title in independent Wales ==
=== Joan (Siwan) ===
Joan, also known as Siwan (her Welsh name), was the illegitimate daughter of John of England. She was the wife of Llywelyn ab Iorwerth (initially King of Gwynedd), effective ruler of all of Wales. During her tenure, she used the titles "Lady of Wales" and "Lady of Snowdon".

=== Eleanor de Montfort and Gwenllian ===
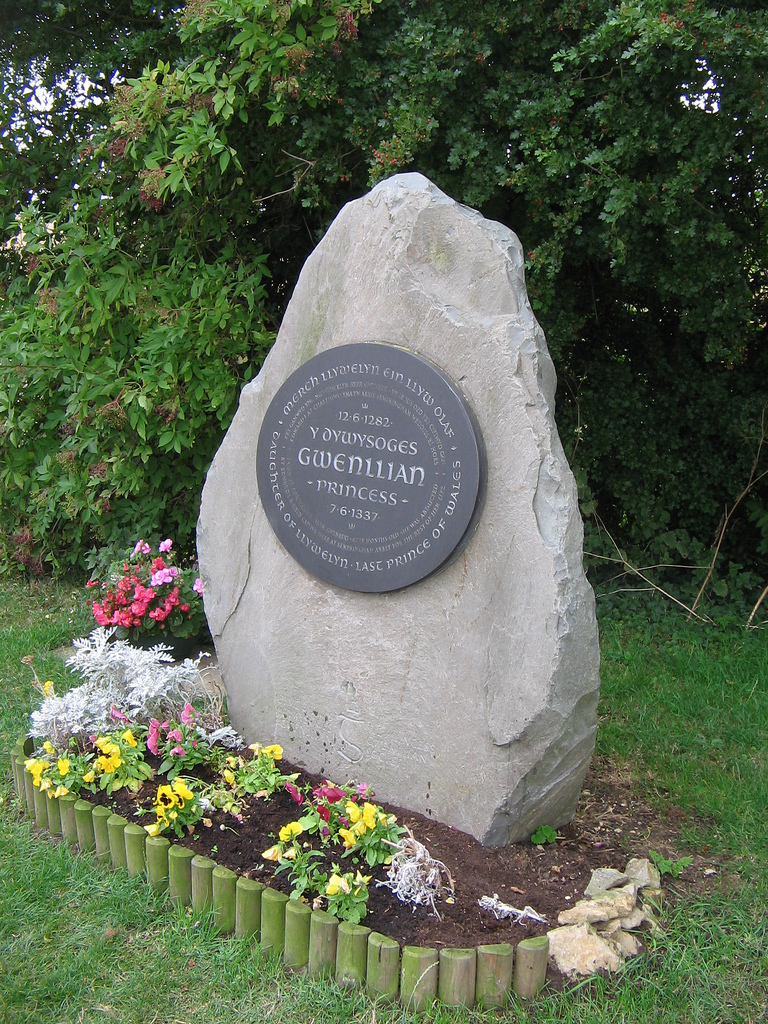
Memorial to Gwenllian in Sempringham, England

Following her wedding ceremony in 1278, Eleanor de Montfort was officially known as Princess of Wales. On 19 June 1282, she died giving birth to her first child, Gwenllian.

After her father, Llywelyn ap Gruffydd, was killed on 11 December 1282, Edward I placed Gwenllian in Sempringham Priory in Lincolnshire, where she remained until her death on 7 June 1337.

Gwenllian's status was acknowledged at least once by the English Crown. When writing to the pope, attempting to secure more money for Sempringham Priory, the king stated that "...herein is kept the Princess of Wales, whom we have to maintain". The title "Princess of Wales" as used here did not have its usual accepted meaning.

=== Margaret Hanmer and Catrin, daughter of Glyndŵr ===
Margaret Hanmer, sometimes known as Marred ferch Dafydd (her Welsh name), was the wife of Owain Glyndŵr. Some modern historians have accorded her the title "Princess of Wales".

Catrin was one of the children of Owain Glyndŵr and Margaret Hanmer. In November 1402, she married Edmund Mortimer, the second son of Edmund Mortimer, 3rd Earl of March and through his mother, a great-grandson of Edward III of England.

Edmund Mortimer died during the siege of Harlech Castle in 1409, of unknown causes. Catrin was subsequently captured alongside her three daughters, and they were taken to the Tower of London, along with Catrin's mother and one of her sisters. The deaths and burials of Catrin and her daughters are recorded, but the causes of their deaths remain unknown. They were laid to rest at St Swithin's Church in London.

=== List ===
Image	Name	Birth	Spouse	Death	Notes
	Joan	1191	Llywelyn ab Iorwerth	2 February 1237	Known as Siwan in Welsh; Lady of Wales and Snowdon; Proposed to have been Princess of Wales
	Isabella de Braose	1222	Dafydd ap Llywelyn	1248	Proposed to have been Princess of Wales
	Eleanor de Montfort	1252	Llywelyn ap Gruffudd	19 June 1282	Princess of Wales; Lady of Snowdon
	Elizabeth Ferrers	1250	Dafydd ap Gruffudd	1300	Proposed to have been Princess of Wales
	Gwenllian ferch Llywelyn	June 1282		7 June 1337	Princess of Wales; daughter of Llywelyn ap Gruffudd
	Margaret Hanmer	1370	Owain Glyndŵr	1420	Later attributed
	Catrin ferch Owain Glyndŵr		Edmund Mortimer	1413	Proposed to have been Princess of Wales; daughter of Owain Glyndŵr

== Spouse of the British (formerly English) heir apparent ==
Joan of Kent married the Prince of Wales, her cousin Edward the Black Prince, in early 1361; their marriage lacked needed dispensation and was annulled in the same year, but afterwards the pair was granted necessary documents by the Pope, and married again, making Joan the Princess of Wales for the second time.

Cecily Neville, wife of Richard of York, 3rd Duke of York, is omitted from this list. While her husband was briefly given various titles, including Prince of Wales, by an Act of Parliament as part of his arrangement to succeed Henry VI, he is not generally recognised as such and is not mentioned in any published summary of the topic.

Although not granted the title in her own right, the future Mary I was, during her youth, invested by her father, Henry VIII, with many of the rights and properties traditionally given to the Prince of Wales, including the use of the official seal of Wales for correspondence. For most of her childhood, Mary was her father's only legitimate child, and for this reason, she was often referred to as the Prince(ss) of Wales, although Henry never formally created her as such. For example, contemporary scholar Juan Luis Vives dedicated his Satellitium Animi to "Dominæ Mariæ Cambriæ Principi, Henrici Octavi Angliæ Regis Filiæ" ("Lady Mary, Prince of Wales, Daughter of Henry VIII, King of England").

Welsh politicians suggested that George VI's elder daughter, Princess Elizabeth (later Queen Elizabeth II), be granted the title on her 18th birthday, but he rejected the idea because he felt such a title belonged solely to the wife of a Prince of Wales and the Prince of Wales had always been the title of the heir apparent.

Camilla, Charles III's second wife, was the Princess of Wales from 2005 to 2022, but did not use the title due to its popular association with her husband's first wife, Diana. Camilla chose to be known as "Duchess of Cornwall" instead, which is traditionally a subsidiary title.

On 9 September 2022, a day after his accession to the throne, Charles III bestowed the title of "Prince of Wales" upon his elder son, William, making his wife, Catherine, the Princess of Wales.

=== List ===
Image	Previous name	Coat of Arms	Birth	Marriage	Became Princess of Wales	Spouse	Change in style	Death	Notes
	Joan, Countess of Kent		19 September 1328	Early 1361 (1st time); 10 October 1361 (2nd time)		Edward of Woodstock (both times)	1361 Marriage annulled (1st time); 7 June 1376 (2nd time) Husband's death; became Dowager Princess of Wales	7 August 1385	
	Anne Neville		11 June 1456	13 December 1470		Edward of Westminster	4 May 1471; Husband's death; became Dowager Princess of Wales	16 March 1485	Later became queen consort as the wife of Richard III
	Catherine of Aragon		16 December 1485	19 May 1499 (by proxy); 14 November 1501		Arthur Tudor	2 April 1502; Husband's death; became Dowager Princess of Wales	7 January 1536	Later became queen consort as the wife of Henry VIII. Marriage annulled in 1533
	Wilhelmina Charlotte Caroline of Brandenburg-Ansbach		1 March 1683	22 August 1705	27 September 1714	George Augustus	11 June 1727; Husband acceded to throne as George II; became queen consort	20 November 1737	
	Augusta of Saxe-Gotha-Altenburg		30 November 1719	17 April 1736		Frederick Louis	31 March 1751; Husband's death; became Dowager Princess of Wales	8 February 1772	
	Caroline Amelia Elizabeth of Brunswick-Wolfenbüttel		17 May 1768	8 April 1795		George Augustus Frederick	29 January 1820; Husband acceded to throne as George IV; became queen consort	7 August 1821	
	Alexandra Caroline Marie Charlotte Louise Julia of Denmark		1 December 1844	10 March 1863		Albert Edward	22 January 1901; Husband acceded to throne as Edward VII; became queen consort	20 November 1925	
	Victoria Mary Augusta Louise Olga Pauline Claudine Agnes of Teck		26 May 1867	6 July 1893	9 November 1901	George Frederick Ernest Albert	6 May 1910; Husband acceded to throne as George V; became queen consort	24 March 1953	
	Diana Frances Spencer		1 July 1961	29 July 1981		Charles Philip Arthur George	28 August 1996; Divorced; assumed the style of Diana, Princess of Wales	31 August 1997	
	Camilla Rosemary Shand		17 July 1947	9 April 2005		Charles Philip Arthur George	8 September 2022; Husband acceded to throne as Charles III; became queen consort	living	Known as Duchess of Cornwall during her tenure
	Catherine Elizabeth Middleton		9 January 1982	29 April 2011	9 September 2022	William Arthur Philip Louis	Incumbent	living	

== See also ==
- The Green Howards (Alexandra, Princess of Wales's Own Yorkshire Regiment)
- The Princess of Wales' Own Regiment (Canada)

== Bibliography ==
- Princesses of Wales by Deborah Fisher. University of Wales Press, 2005.
- 'Tystiolaeth Garth Celyn' Y Traethodydd 1998 ISSN 0969-8930
