= Ferch =

Ferch may refer to:

Place:

- Ferch, Brandenburg, village in the German state of Brandenburg

Surname:

- Heino Ferch (born 1963), award-winning German film and television actor
- John Arthur Ferch (1936–2020), United States diplomat

In Welsh names (pedigrees), it is the lenition of merch, meaning "daughter [of]", as in:

- Alys ferch Owain Glyndŵr, daughter of Owain Glyndŵr, who led a revolt in Wales between 1400 and c.1416 against King Henry IV of England
- Branwen ferch Llŷr, legendary tale from medieval Welsh literature and the second of the four branches of the Mabinogi
- Catrin ferch Gruffudd ap Hywel (fl. 1555), poet
- Catrin ferch Owain Glyndŵr (died 1413), one of the daughters of Margaret Hanmer and Owain Glyndŵr
- Elen ferch Llywelyn (1206–1253), daughter of Llywelyn the Great of Gwynedd by Lady Joan, daughter of King John of England
- Gwenllian ferch Gruffydd (1097–1136), Princess Consort of Deheubarth in Wales, and married to Gruffydd ap Rhys, Prince of Deheubarth
- Gwladys ferch Dafydd, the daughter of Dafydd ap Gruffudd, the last Welsh Prince of Wales, and Elizabeth Ferrers
- Marged ferch Ifan (1696–1793), a harpist and wrestler
- Nest ferch Cadell, the daughter of the 8th century King of Powys, wife of Merfyn Frych, King of Gwynedd and mother to Rhodri the Great
- Nest ferch Rhys (died 1136), Welsh princess of Deheubarth who was renowned for her beauty
