= Margaret Hanmer =

Wife of Owain Glyndŵr

Princess consort of Wales
- Tenure: 1404 – c. 1415
- Born: 1370; Wales
- Died: 1420 (age 49–50); Wales
- Spouse: Owain Glyndŵr
- Issue: Gruffudd ab Owain Glyndŵr; Maredudd ab Owain Glyndŵr; Alys ferch Owain Glyndŵr; Catrin ferch Owain Glyndŵr
- House: Mathrafal
- Father: David Hanmer
- Mother: Angharad ferch Llywelyn Ddu

Margaret Hanmer (c. 1370 – c. 1420), sometimes known by her Welsh name of Marred ferch Dafydd, was the wife of Owain Glyndŵr.

== Early life and marriage ==
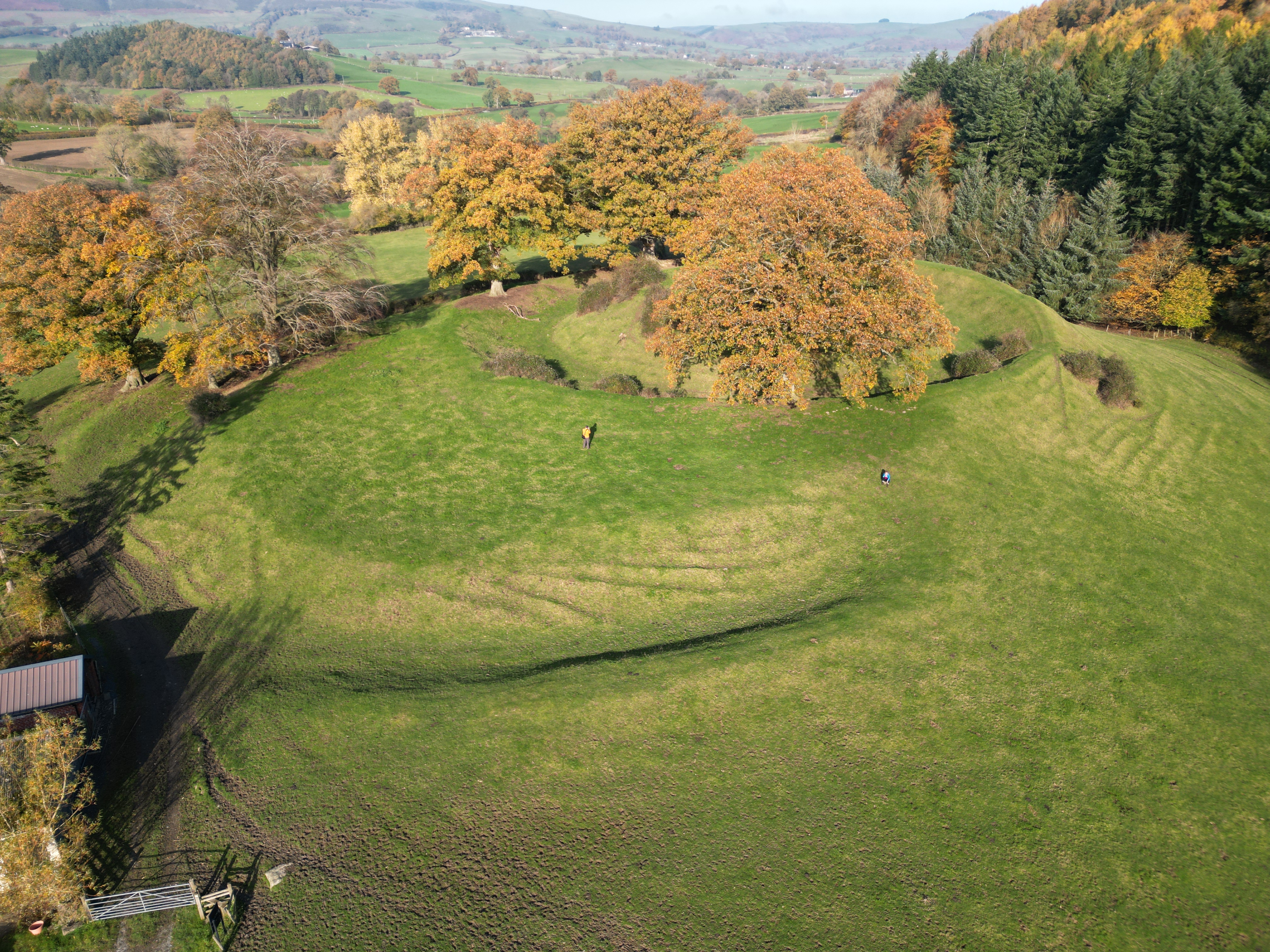
Aerial view of Sycharth, the site of Owain Glyndŵr's court

Nothing is known of Margaret's early life, not even the precise date of her marriage. She was the child of Sir David Hanmer, who was a chief justice of the King's Bench during Edward III's reign, and his wife Angharad ferch Llywelyn Ddu, and was probably raised in a Welsh household. Her father taught Owain Glyndŵr when the latter studied law; it is not known when Margaret married Owain, although it is thought that their wedding may have taken place in 1383 in the church of St Chad's in Hanmer. The number of children she bore, and the dates of their births, are likewise uncertain.

The poet Iolo Goch praises Margaret and her generosity in his poem "Llys Owain Glyndŵr yn Sycharth", one of three he composed in Owain's honour.

A gwraig orau o'r gwragedd,
Gwyn fy myd o'i gwin a'i medd!
Merch eglur llin marchoglyw,
Urddol hael anional yw;
A'i blant a ddeuant bob ddau,
Nythaid teg o benaethau.

And the best of wives,
Blessed am I in her wine and mead!
A fine lady of knightly line,
Most generous by nature;
Her children come in two by two,
A beautiful nest of chieftains.

Margaret had three brothers, Gruffydd, Philip and John, all of whom supported Glyndŵr when he formally assumed his ancestral title of Prince of Powys in 1400. The Hamners were still with Owain when a Welsh parliament proclaimed the latter Prince of Wales at Machynlleth in 1404.

Although some modern histories have therefore accorded Margaret the title "Princess of Wales", there is no contemporary record that Hanmer used either that title or her husband's earlier title of Prince of Powys. Only one wife of a Welsh prince is known to have used the title: Eleanor de Montfort, wife of Llywelyn ap Gruffudd, the last Prince of Wales.

Margaret's husband held estates at Sycharth, Glyndyfrdwy, and elsewhere in North Wales. According to Sir John E. Lloyd, Margaret bore her husband five sons and four or five daughters. One daughter, Catrin, married Edmund Mortimer, son of the Earl of March and brother-in-law of the famous Harry Hotspur, who had been taken prisoner at the battle of Bryn Glas in 1402; when forbidden by the King to exercise his right to ransom himself, Sir Edmund allied himself with Glyndŵr. Another daughter, Alys, married Sir John Scudamore of Monnington Straddle, Sheriff of Hereford and castellan of several royal border fortresses. A third daughter, Janet, married Sir John de Croft of Croft Castle in Herefordshire, while a fourth, Margaret, married Sir Richard Monnington of Monnington, also in Herefordshire. Glyndŵr's sons are given as Gruffudd, Madog, Maredudd, Thomas, John, and David. Gruffudd and Maredudd were certainly Margaret's sons, but which of the remaining four were also hers remains unknown.

== Rebellion ==
After Owain proclaimed himself Prince of Powys on 16 September 1400, Margaret and her children were obliged to move to more secure accommodation to avoid capture by the English.

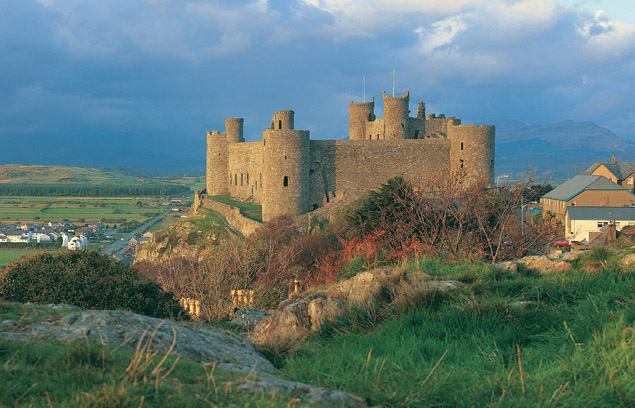
Harlech Castle

After their homes at Sycharth and Glyndyfrdwy were burned in 1403, they lived, among other places, at Harlech Castle, which was taken in 1409 by the young Henry of Monmouth. Upon the fall of Harlech, Margaret was captured and imprisoned in the Tower of London with her daughter Catrin, another daughter, and Catrin's three daughters. Margaret's oldest son, Gruffudd, died in the Tower in 1411. Margaret survived the deaths of her two daughters and three granddaughters, but her own death is unrecorded. She is known to have been survived by her son Maredudd, who was alive in 1421, and by her daughter Alys, Lady Scudamore, of Monnington Straddle.

== See also ==
- List of unsolved deaths

== Ancestry ==
Ancestors of Margaret Hanmer

Sir Thomas de Macclesfield of Hamner
John Hanmer (1277–1309)
Philip Hanmer (b. 1305)
Einion ap Gruffydd ap Gwenwynwyn of Powys
Hawis ferch Einion ap Gruffydd
Sir David Hanmer
Rhirid ab Ynyr ab Ionas
Dafydd ap Rhirid
Nest (Agnes) ferch Dafydd ap Rhirid
Ednyfed ab Iorwerth
Gwynhwyfar ferch Ednyfed
Margaret Hanmer
Iorwerth Foel of Pengwern
Gruffydd ab Iorwerth Foel
Gwerful ferch Maredudd of Cantref Mechain
Llywelyn Ddu ap Gruffydd of Bryncunallt
Angharad ferch Llywelyn
Madog Fychan
Marred ferch Madog Fychan
Gruffudd ab Iorwerth of Aberbury
Gwladus ferch Gruffudd ab Iorwerth
Marred ferch Rhys Ieuanc

== Family connections ==
Owain Glyndŵr, the Hanmers and the Mortimers

Phylip Hanmer
Sir David Hanmer; Cefnogi OGD d. 1387	Angharad daughter of Llywelyn Ddu
Owain Glyndŵr; Prince of Wales	Margaret Hanmer; Princess of Wales d. 1420	John Hanmer; Supported Glyndŵr	Phylip Hanmer; Supported Glyndŵr	Gruffudd Hanmer; Supported Glyndŵr
Gruffudd ab Owain Glyndŵr d. 1412	Maredudd ab Owain Glyndŵr; Still alive in 1421	Catrin ferch Owain Glyndŵr d. 1413	Edmund Mortimer; Supported Glyndŵr d. 1409	Roger Mortimer; 4th Earl of March d. 1398
