= Gruffudd ab Owain Glyndŵr =

Son of Owain Glyndŵr

Gruffudd ap Owain Glyndŵr (c. 1375 – c. 1412) was the eldest son of Margaret Hanmer and Owain Glyndŵr, who led a major revolt in Wales between 1400 and about 1415. (Note: There is a connection with Gruffudd ap Owain and the castles at Grosmont and Skenfrith.)

== Early life ==
Little is known about any of the children of Owain Glyndŵr. Gruffudd is recorded as being Owain's eldest son and would-be heir to the crown of Wales had his father's rebellion ultimately been successful in creating an independent Wales.

== Role in the rebellion ==
He is known to have taken part in a raid in south Wales in 1405, alongside his uncle Tudur ap Gruffudd, and another rebel Captain Rhys Gethin. They were defeated by Prince Henry of Monmouth, later to become King Henry V or possibly John Talbot, 1st Earl of Shrewsbury. The exact place and date of this battle is subject to dispute, but the Annals of Owain Glyndwr call it the Battle of Pwll Melyn, near Usk. The result appears to have been a major Welsh defeat, the capture of Gruffudd ab Owain Glyndŵr, and the deaths of Tudur and Rhys Gethin.

== Imprisonment and death ==
Before being taken to the Tower of London he was first imprisoned at Nottingham. He was sent from there to the Tower of London and after seven years died in prison of bubonic plague.

== Family ==
It is not known if he was married or had sired any children of his own.

Owain Glyndŵr, the Hanmers and the Mortimers

Phylip Hanmer
Sir David Hanmer; Cefnogi OGD d. 1387	Angharad daughter of Llywelyn Ddu
Owain Glyndŵr; Prince of Wales	Margaret Hanmer; Princess of Wales d. 1420	John Hanmer; Supported Glyndŵr	Phylip Hanmer; Supported Glyndŵr	Gruffudd Hanmer; Supported Glyndŵr
Gruffudd ab Owain Glyndŵr d. 1412	Maredudd ab Owain Glyndŵr; Still alive in 1421	Catrin ferch Owain Glyndŵr d. 1413	Edmund Mortimer; Supported Glyndŵr d. 1409	Roger Mortimer; 4th Earl of March d. 1398
