= Catrin ferch Owain Glyndŵr (sculpture) =

2001 sculpture in the City of London

Coordinates: 51.5119°N 0.0895°W

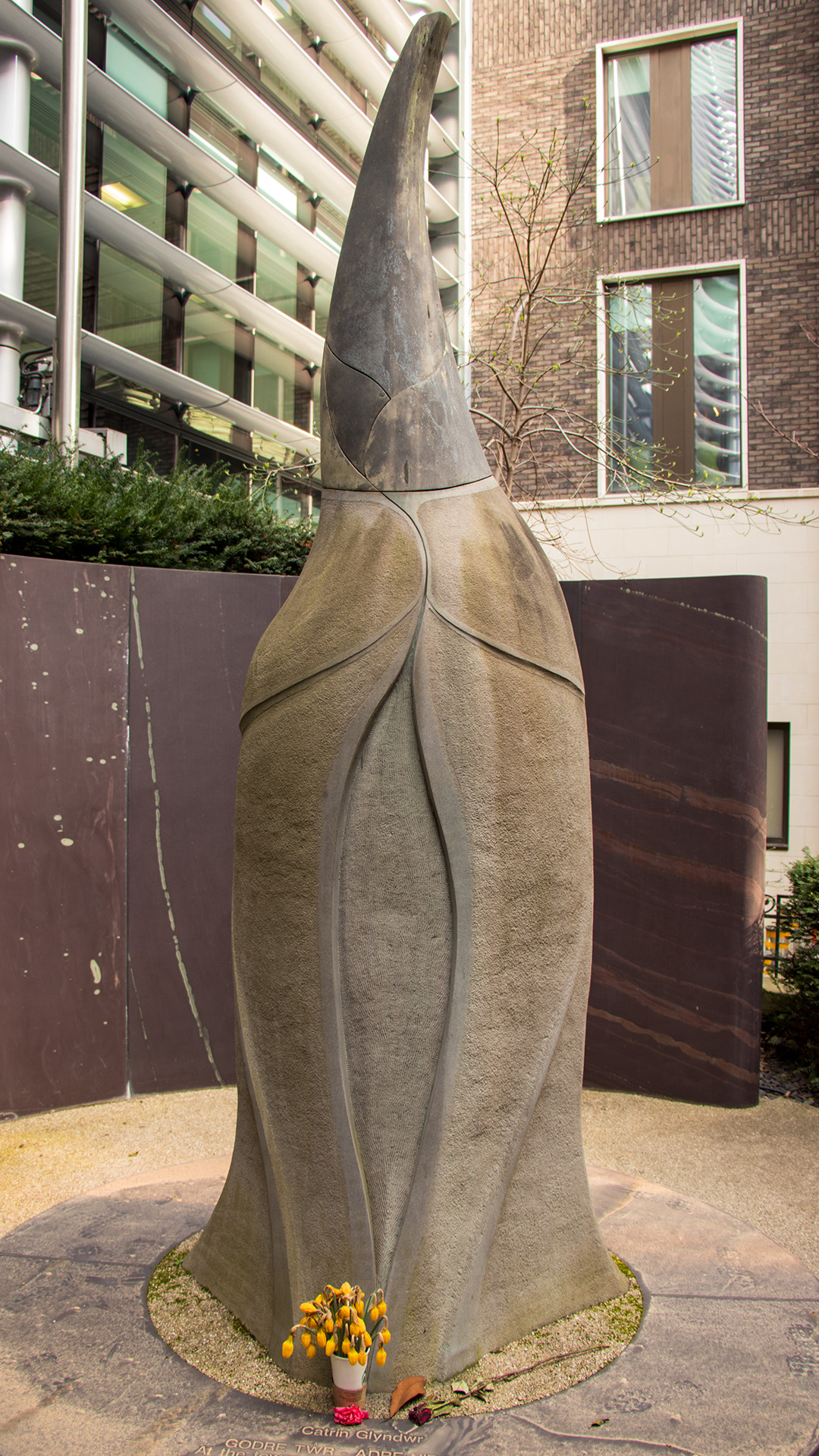
Catrin ferch Owain Glyndŵr in 2022

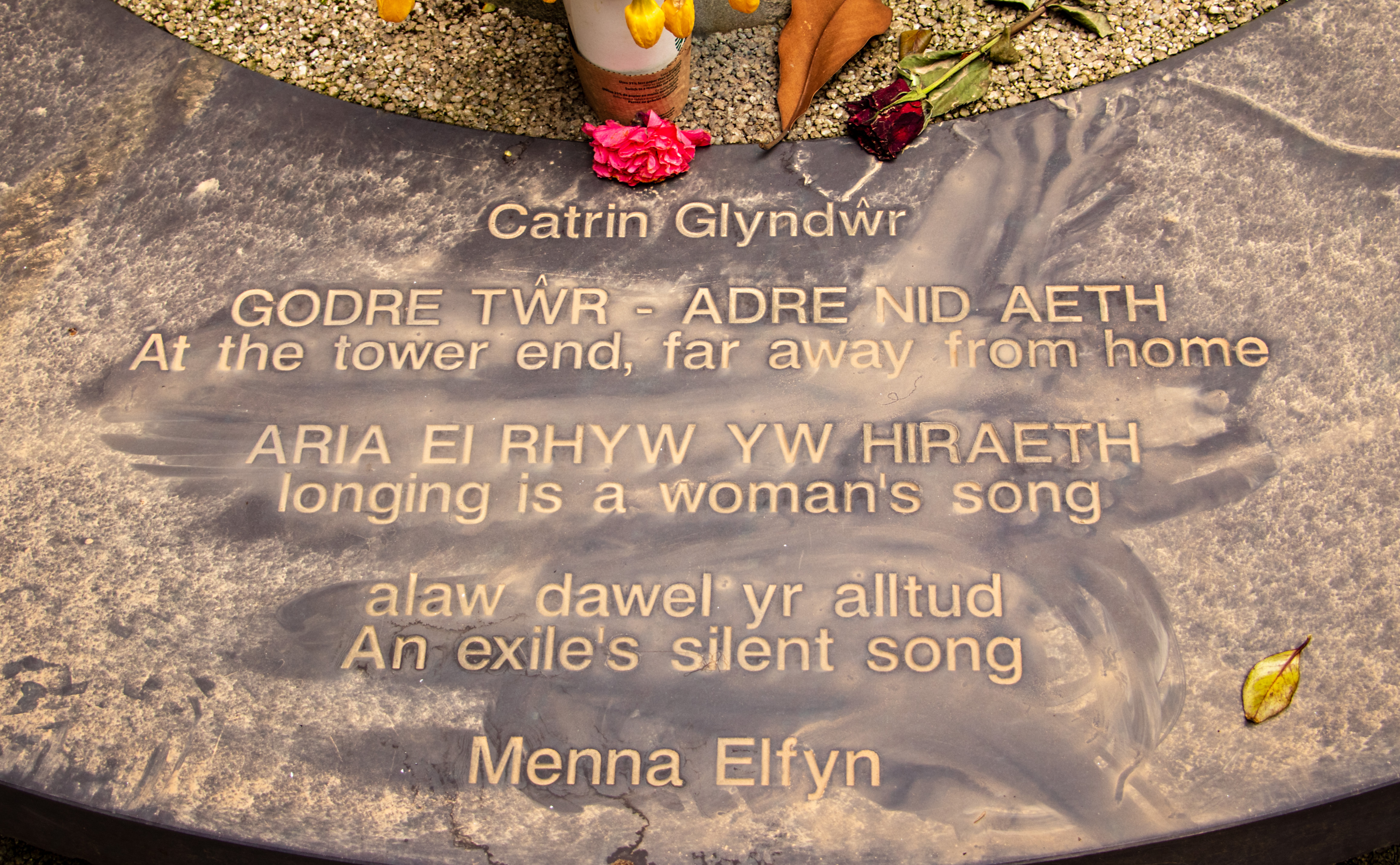
Menna Elfyn's poem on the base of the sculpture.

Catrin ferch Owain Glyndŵr is a sculpture in Oxford Court, in the City of London.

It was created by Nic Stradlyn-John and Bryn Chegwydden and Richard Renshaw. The creation of the sculpture was funded by public donations with individual contributions from I.A. Monnington Taylor, Sir Julian Hodge, and Hanson Plc. It is made from bluestone from Gelligaer in south Wales.

The work commemorates Catrin ferch Owain Glyndŵr, the daughter of the Prince of Wales, Owain Glyndŵr. It is also intended as a memorial to the suffering of children and women in war. Catrin and her daughters were held as captives in the Tower of London. They were buried in St Swithin, London Stone, the site of the sculpture was once the churchyard of St Swithin. This is the only known burial location of a member of the Glyndŵr family.

The sculpture was unveiled by Sian Phillips on Owain Glyndŵr Day, 16 September 2001. Phillips described the work as creating a " ... focal point in London for people with Welsh connections" and that she was sure it would "become a natural venue for future events and celebrations". In 2003 a stone with a Welsh language poem with an English translation by Menna Elfyn was installed at the base of the sculpture. The stone had featured in an exhibition on Catrin at the National Library of Wales.
