= Kentchurch =

Village in Herefordshire, England

Coordinates: 51.9261°N 2.8456°W

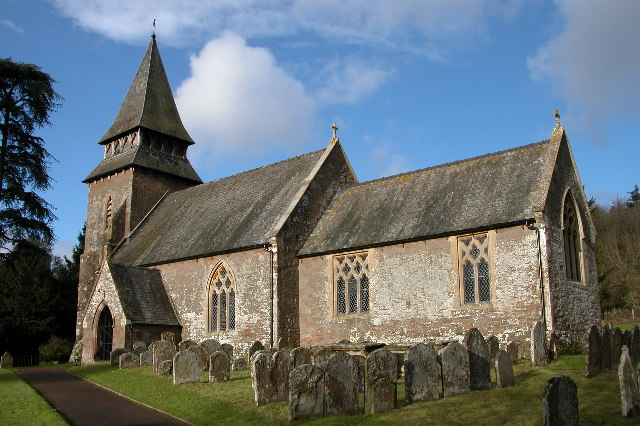
- St Mary's church

- Location within Herefordshire
- Population: 257 (2011)
- OS grid reference: SO415255
- Unitary authority: Herefordshire
- Region: West Midlands
- Country: England
- Sovereign state: United Kingdom
- Post town: HEREFORD
- Postcode district: HR2
- Dialling code: 01981
- Police: West Mercia
- Fire: Hereford and Worcester
- Ambulance: West Midlands
- UK Parliament: Hereford and South Herefordshire

Kentchurch is a small village and civil parish in Herefordshire, England. It is located some 13 miles (21 km) south-west of Hereford and 13 miles (21 km) north-east of Abergavenny, beside the River Monnow and adjoining the boundary between England and Wales. The village name probably derives from an original dedication of the church to a 5th-century nun, Cein, or her sister Ceingar, who were daughters of Brychan, king of Brycheiniog.

According to one version of the legend, Kentchurch was the home of the folk figure Jack o' Kent.

== Kentchurch Court ==
Kentchurch Court is a historic house and Grade I listed building, dating back largely to the 14th century. It was enlarged in the late 17th or early 18th century, and was partly remodelled in the Gothic revival style by John Nash after 1795. Further reconstruction took place in the 1820s. The estate contains a large deer park, dating from the time when the land was owned by the Knights Templar.

It is the family home of the Scudamore family. Family members included Sir John Scudamore, who acted as constable and steward of a number of royal castles in south Wales at the start of the 15th century. He secretly married Alys, one of the daughters of Owain Glyndŵr, in 1410, and it has been suggested that the couple may have harboured Glyndŵr himself at Kentchurch after his disappearance around 1412, until his death.

In 2004, Kentchurch Court was used as the location of a Channel 4 TV show, Regency House Party. It was the subject of another Channel 4 documentary as part of the Country House Rescue series in 2011.

== Church of St. Mary ==
The parish church is dedicated to St. Mary. Parts date from the 14th century, and there are 17th- and 18th-century monuments to the Scudamore family, but the church was largely rebuilt by the family in the 19th century.
