= Henry Lewis (academic) =

British academic (1889–1968)

Henry Lewis CBE (21 August 1889 – 14 January 1968) was Professor of Welsh Language and Literature at the University College of Swansea from 1921 to 1954.

== Life and career ==
Lewis was born in Ynystawe, Glamorgan in south Wales on 21 August 1889. He was educated at the county school in Ystalyfera before obtaining a degree in Welsh at University College, Cardiff. He then moved to Jesus College, Oxford and studied with Sir John Rhys. After teaching in Ystalyfera and Llanelli county schools, he served as a sergeant in the Welsh Guards and a second lieutenant in the Royal Welch Fusiliers during the First World War. After the war, he was an assistant lecturer in the Welsh department at Cardiff before being appointed Professor of Welsh Language and Literature at University College, Swansea in 1921. He held this position until his retirement in 1954, when he was awarded the CBE. He died on 14 January 1968.

== Work ==
Lewis has been described as "standing in the front rank of scholars" who tackled the lack of essential texts for newly established courses in Welsh language and literature. His work included translations of old texts, editing and commenting upon the work of medieval poets such as Iolo Goch and work on renaissance prose. He also worked on comparative Celtic studies, writing a grammar of Middle Cornish and of Middle Breton. He was a member of the editorial committee of the University of Wales Welsh Dictionary and of Y Caniedydd, the hymnal of Welsh Independents. He also worked on translating government reports and served on various public bodies including the Welsh Joint Education Committee and the council of Coleg Harlech (later becoming chairman). He was a vice-president of the National Library of Wales and of the Honourable Society of Cymmrodorion.
