= Sycharth =

Castle in Powys, Wales

Sycharth Motte and Bailey Castle
- Llansilin, Montgomeryshire, Wales
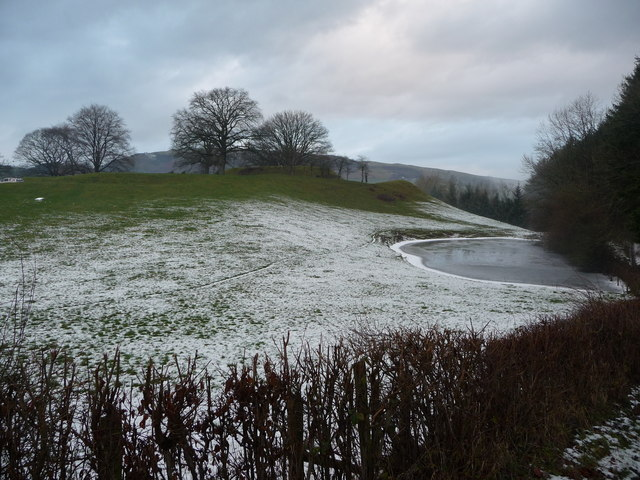
- Sycharth from field, showing motte

Site information
- Owner: Cadw guardianship
- Condition: Grass covered mound with banks and outer bailey.

Location
- Location in Wales
- Coordinates: 52.824498°N 3.180842°W

Site history
- Built: Norman Period
- Materials: Timber Castle
- Demolished: 1403
- Events: Revolt of Owain Glyndŵr (1400–09)

Sycharth was a motte and bailey castle near Llansilin, Powys, Wales. Until 1996 Sycharth was in the historic county of Denbighshire, but was then transferred to the Shire area of Montgomeryshire within Powys. Sycharth was the birthplace of Owain Glyndŵr.

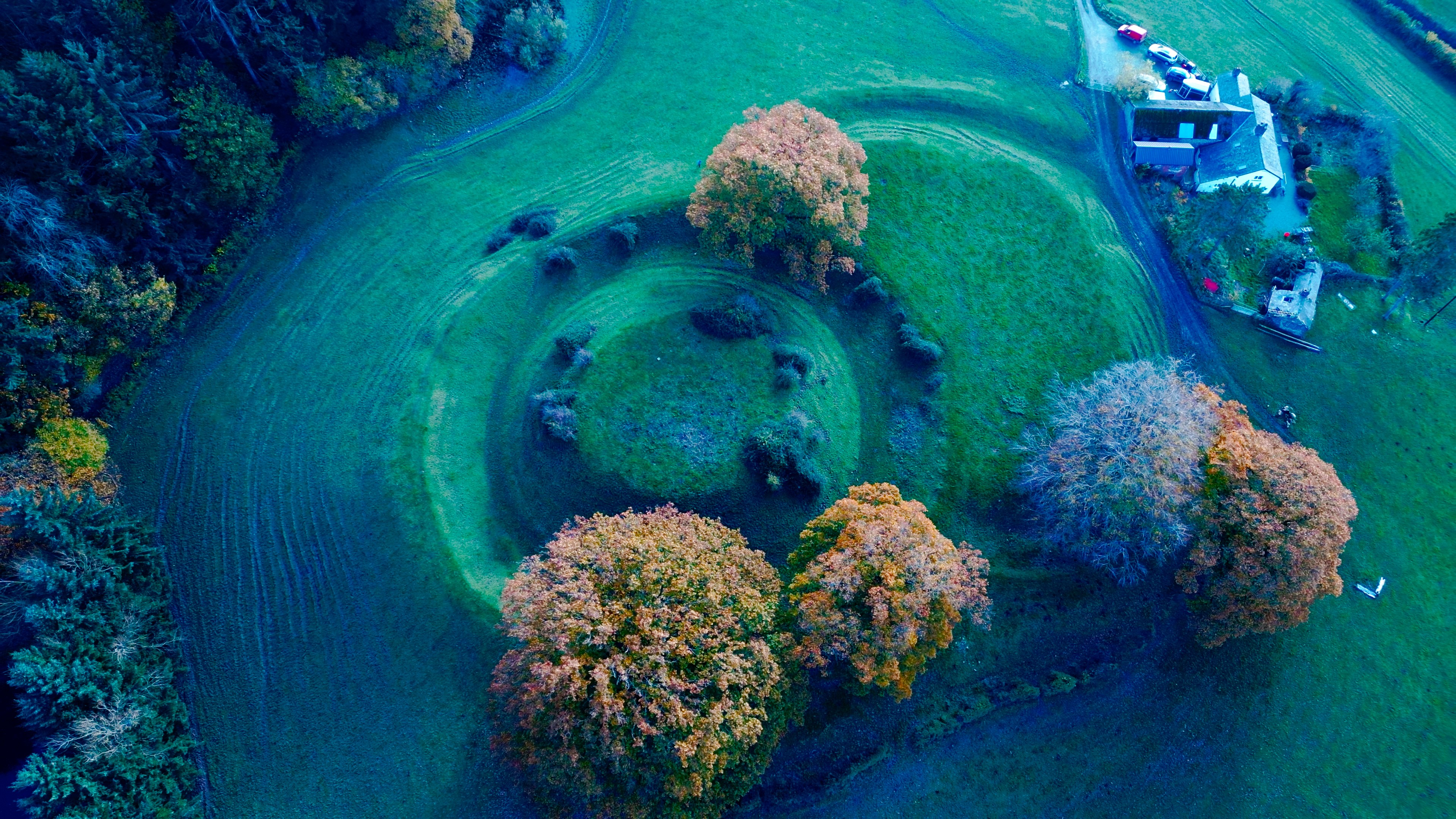
Bird's-eye view of Sycharth

== Location ==
Sycharth sits in the valley of the river Cynllaith, a tributary of the Afon Tanat. The site of Owain Glyndŵr’s manor house lies about a kilometre to the west of the boundary between England and Wales with a belt of woodland on the higher ground to the east known as Parc Sycharth. Immediately to the west of the site is a farm that was the courthouse for the township until the 19th century. The site is on a minor road close to the B4580, south of Llansilin and to the southwest of Oswestry. The site is in the guardianship of Cadw and there is a small carpark with information boards.

== The earlier history of the castle ==
Domesday Book

Mersete Hundred, Shropshire 'The same Rainald has in Wales 2 commotes 'Chenlie' Cynllaith and 'Derniou' Edeyrnion. From the one he has 60 shillings by way of 'ferm' and from the other from the Welshmen 8 cows'.

— Domesday Book, Folio 255
1086

The castle was situated in the Welsh territory of Powys Fadog which had formed part of the Welsh Kingdom of Powys. Following the Norman Conquest two of the commotes, Cynllaith and Edeyrnion came under the control of the Normans. There seems little doubt that Sycharth or ‘Cynllaith Owain’ was originally a Motte-and-bailey built by the Normans. An entry in the Domesday Book, would indicate that this had taken place before 1086. The Normans also built a castle at Rhug that would have been the centre for Edeyrnion.

These commotes passed into the possession of Madog Crypl c1275-1304, described as Lord of Glyndyfrdwy and Lord of Cynllaith Owain. Madog was a direct descendant of the Princes of Powys and Gruffudd Fychan II, the father of Owain Glyndŵr, was probably his grandson. Owain Glyndŵr inherited Sycharth in 1369 and it was here that Glyndŵr lived with his wife Margaret Hanmer and their children.

== Iolo Goch's description ==
Iolo Goch described Sycharth as containing ‘nine plated buildings on the scale of eighteen mansions, fair wooden buildings on top of a green hill’ and ‘a tiled roof on every house with frowning forehead, and a chimney from which the smoke would grow; nine symmetrical, identical halls, and nine wardrobes by each one’.

== Archaeological evidence ==
Excavations in the early 1960s revealed the presence of two timber halls on the flat topped mound, one being 43 metres in length and provided evidence of the site being burned, as it was by Harry of Monmouth, later to become King Henry V when he was present to oversee the total destruction of the site in May 1403.

== Destruction ==
Prince Henry wrote to his father King Henry IV on May 15, 1403, that "we took our people and went to a place of the said Oweyn, well built, which was his principal mansion called Saghern, where we supposed that we should have found him if he had been willing to have fought in the manner as he said, but upon our arrival we found no one; hence we caused the whole place and many of his other houses of his tenants in the neighbourhood to be burnt and then went directly to his other place of Glyndourdy (Glyndyfrdwy) to seek for him there. We caused a fine lodge in his park to be burned and all the country therabout and we lodged at rest there all that night..."

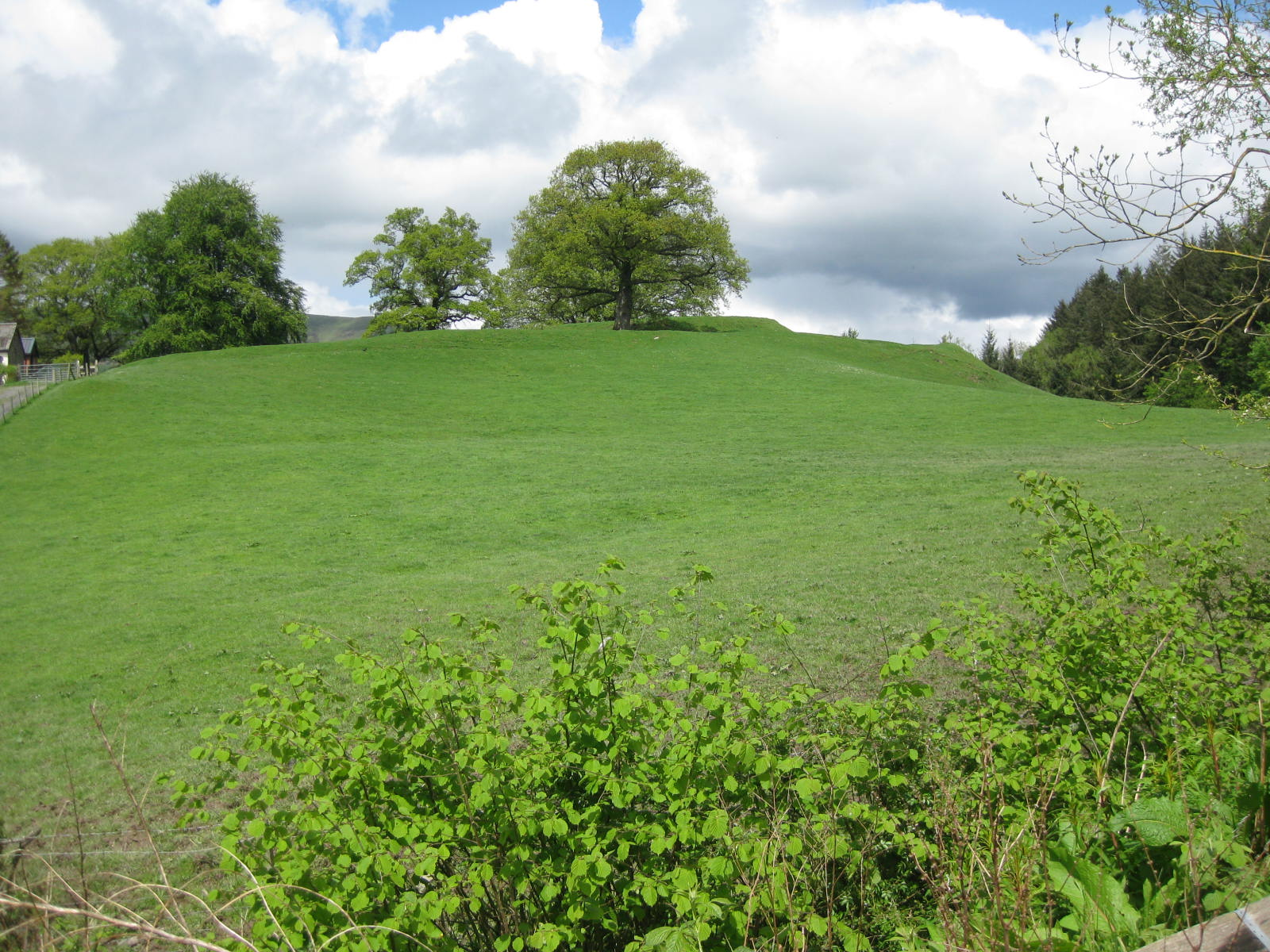
Sycharth, Motte and Bailey Castle, Llansilin, Powys

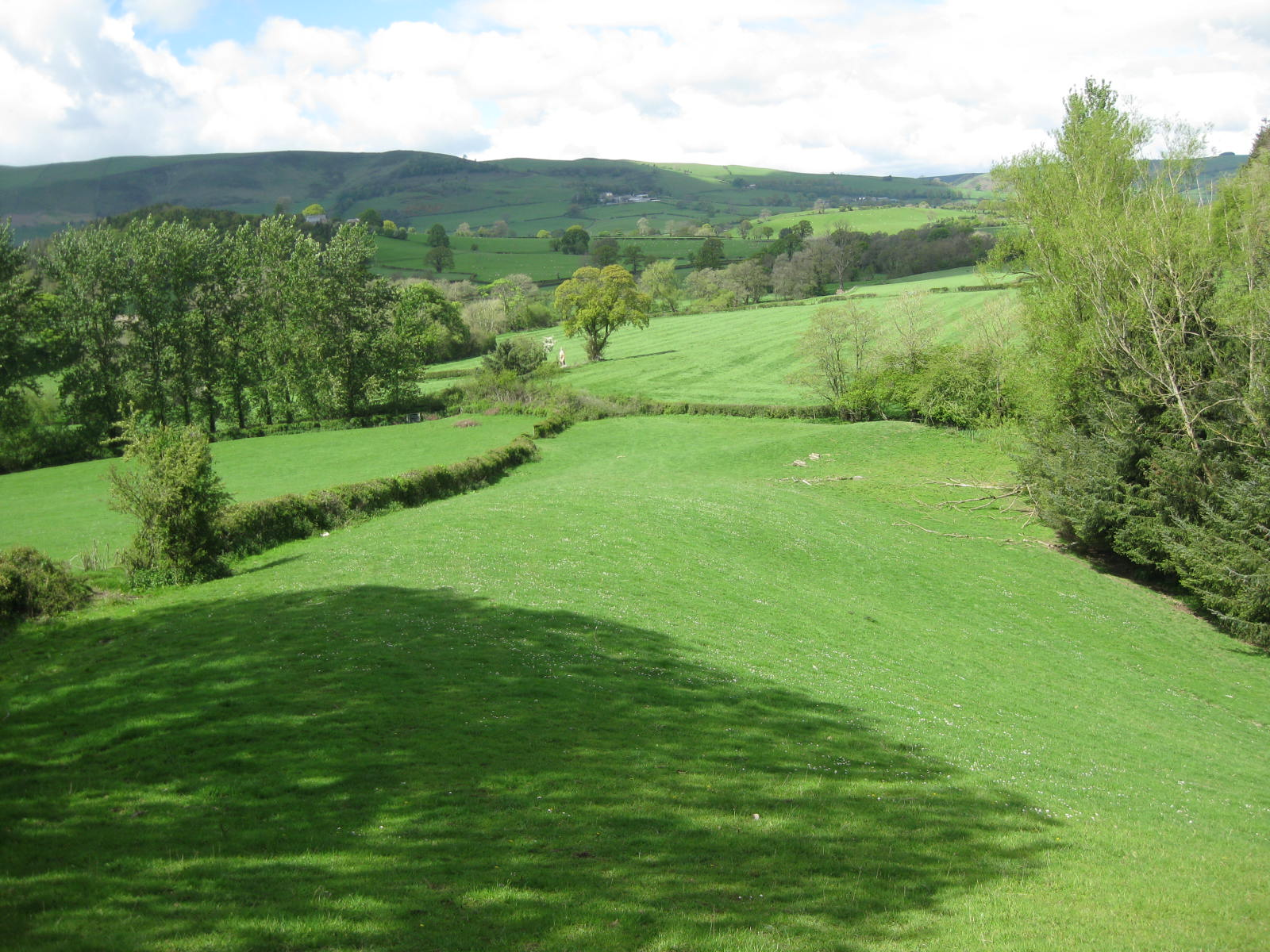
Sycharth, Motte and Bailey Castle looking towards Llansilin

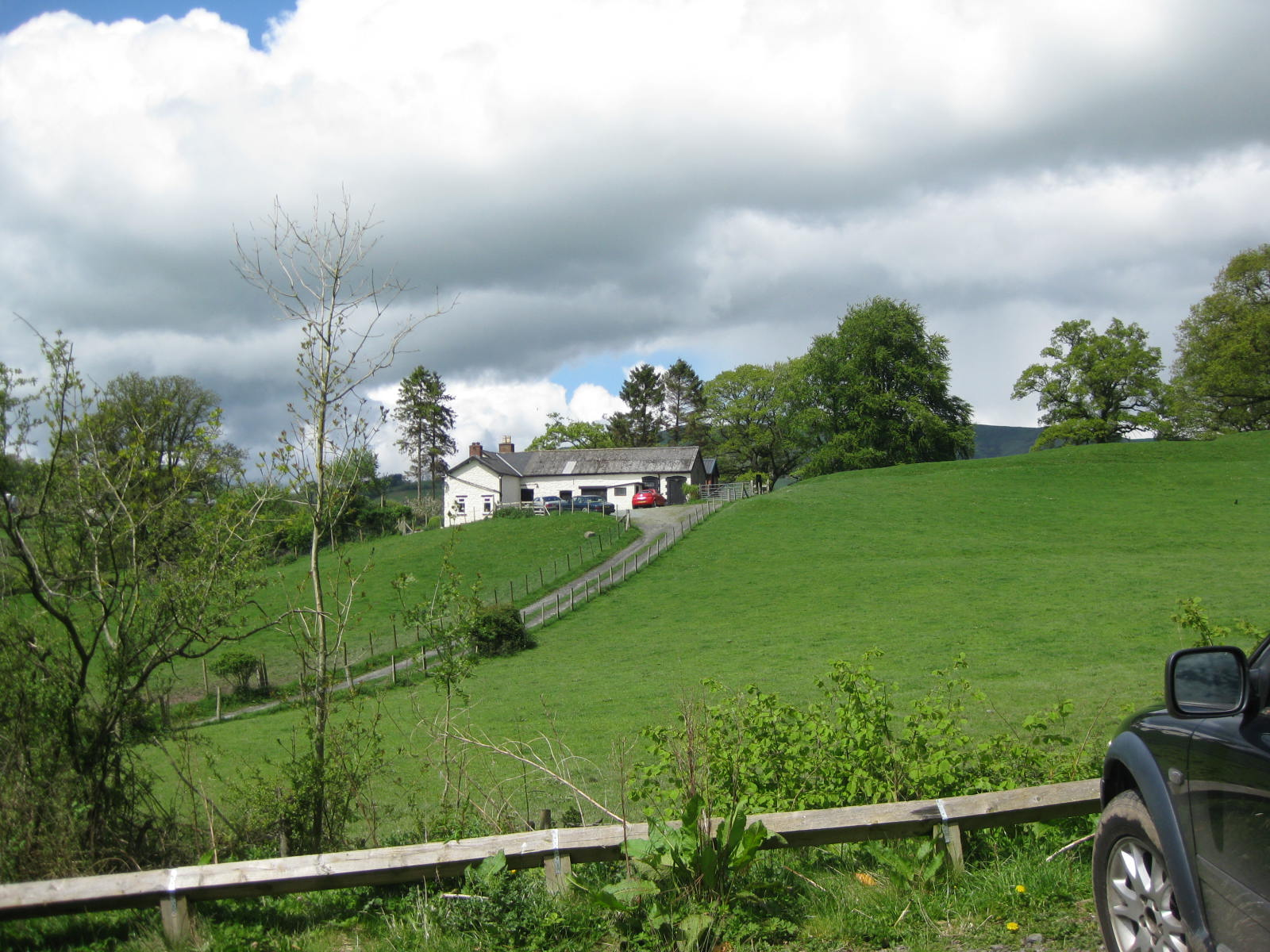
Sycharth, Motte and Bailey Castle and adjacent farmhouse

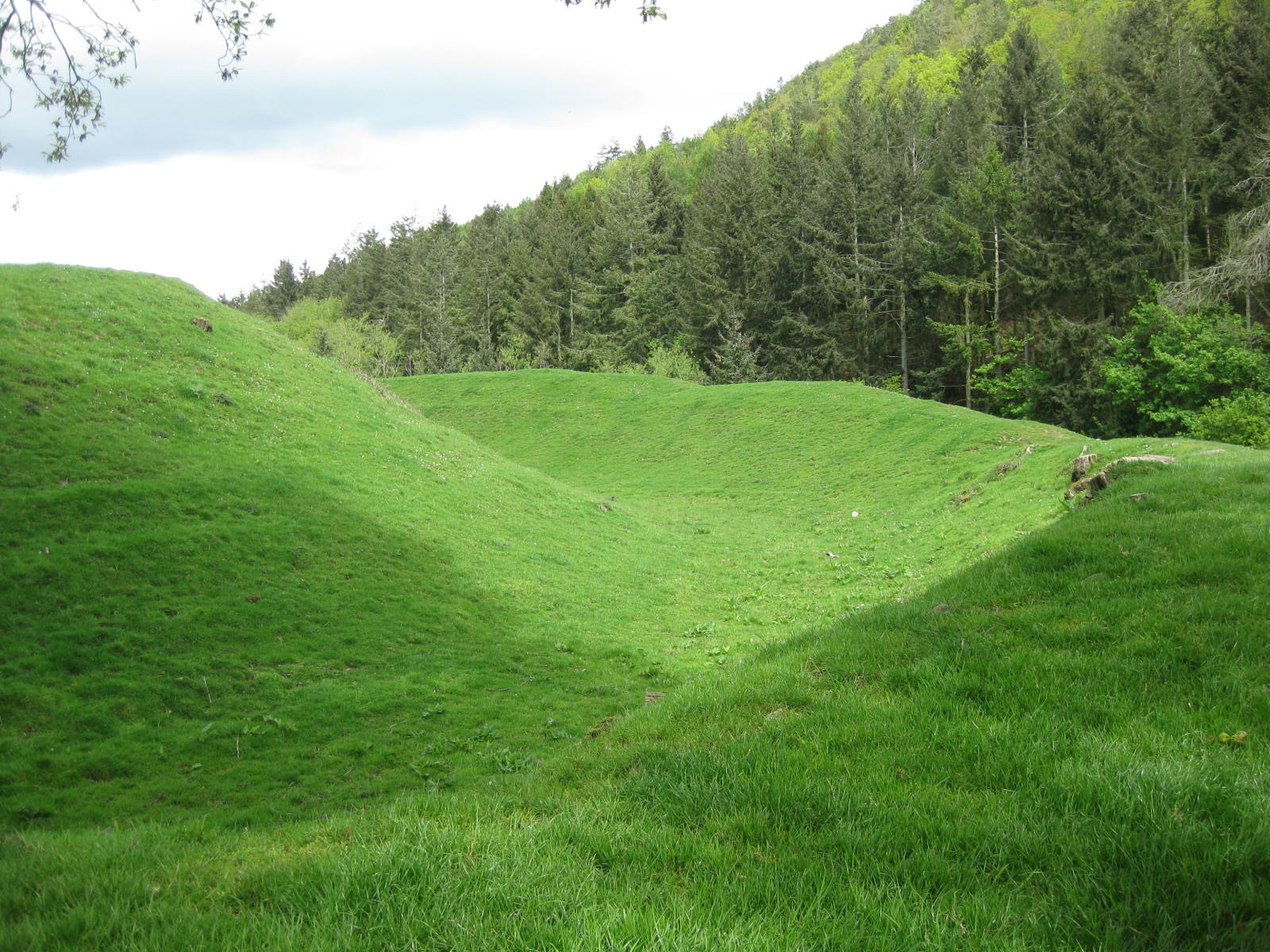
Sycharth, Motte and Bailey Castle with the woodland of Parc Sycharth

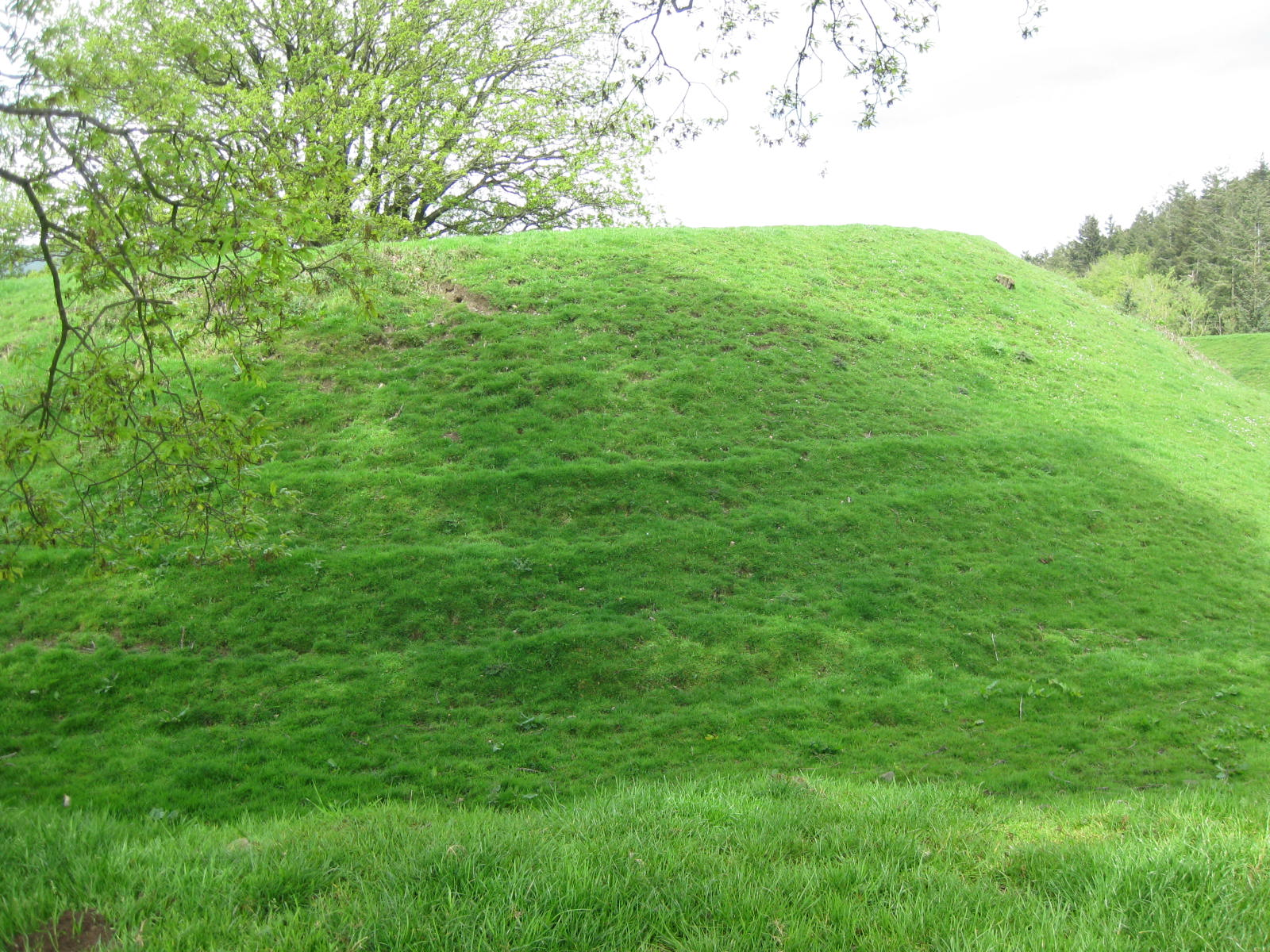
Sycharth, Motte from the south.

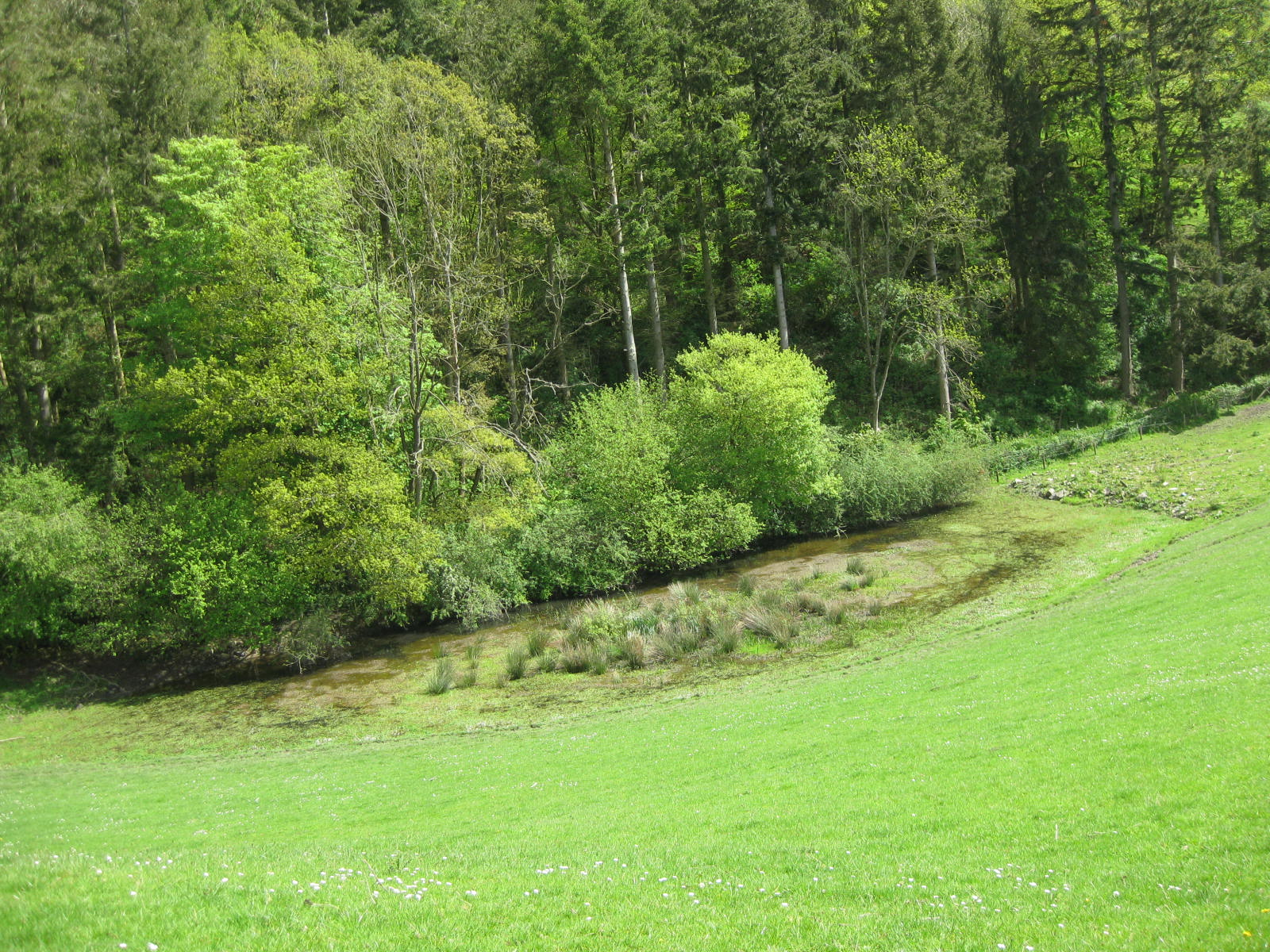
Sycharth, Looking from inner bank to Medieval fishpond.

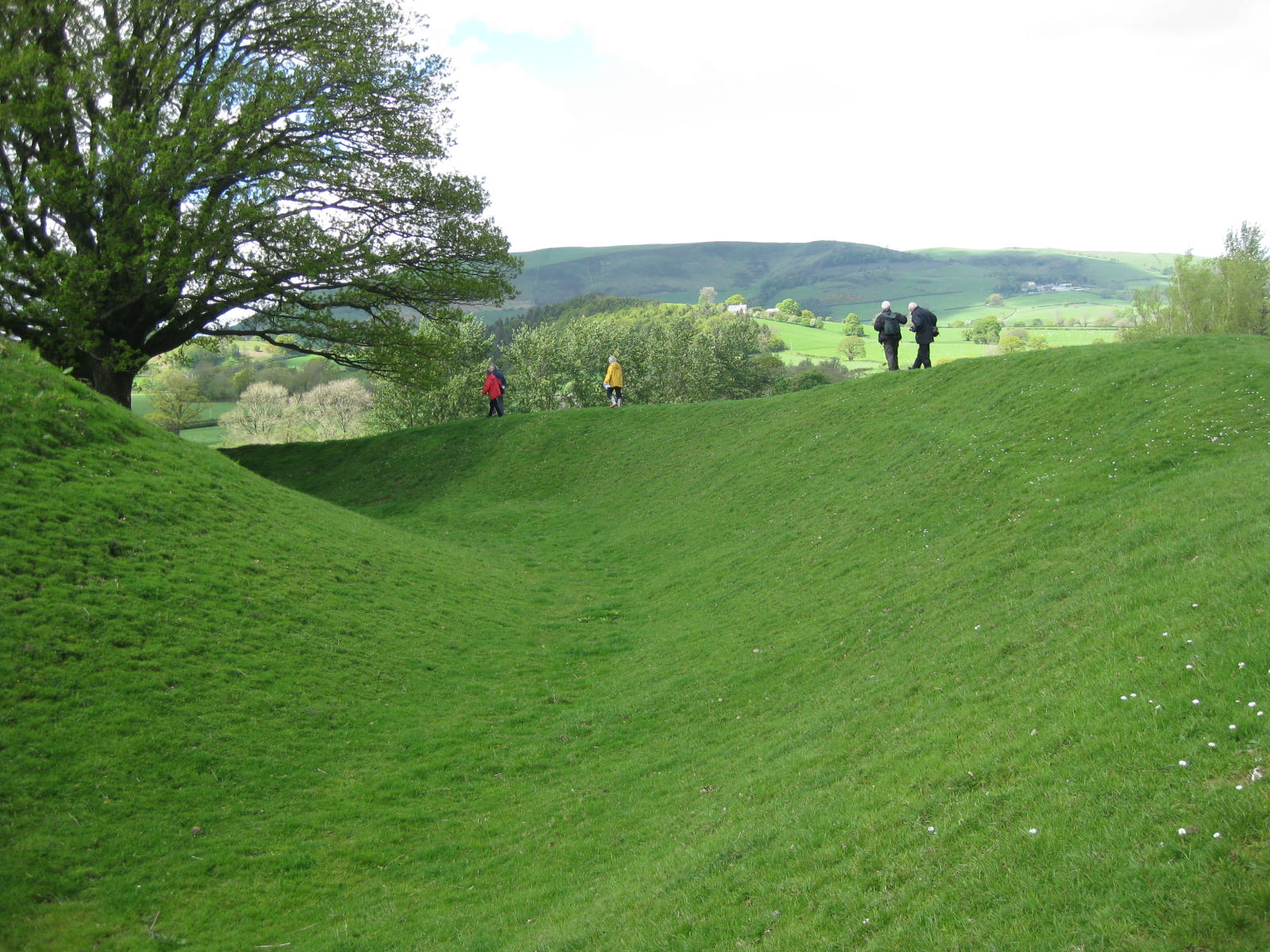
Sycharth, Motte and bank on N side.

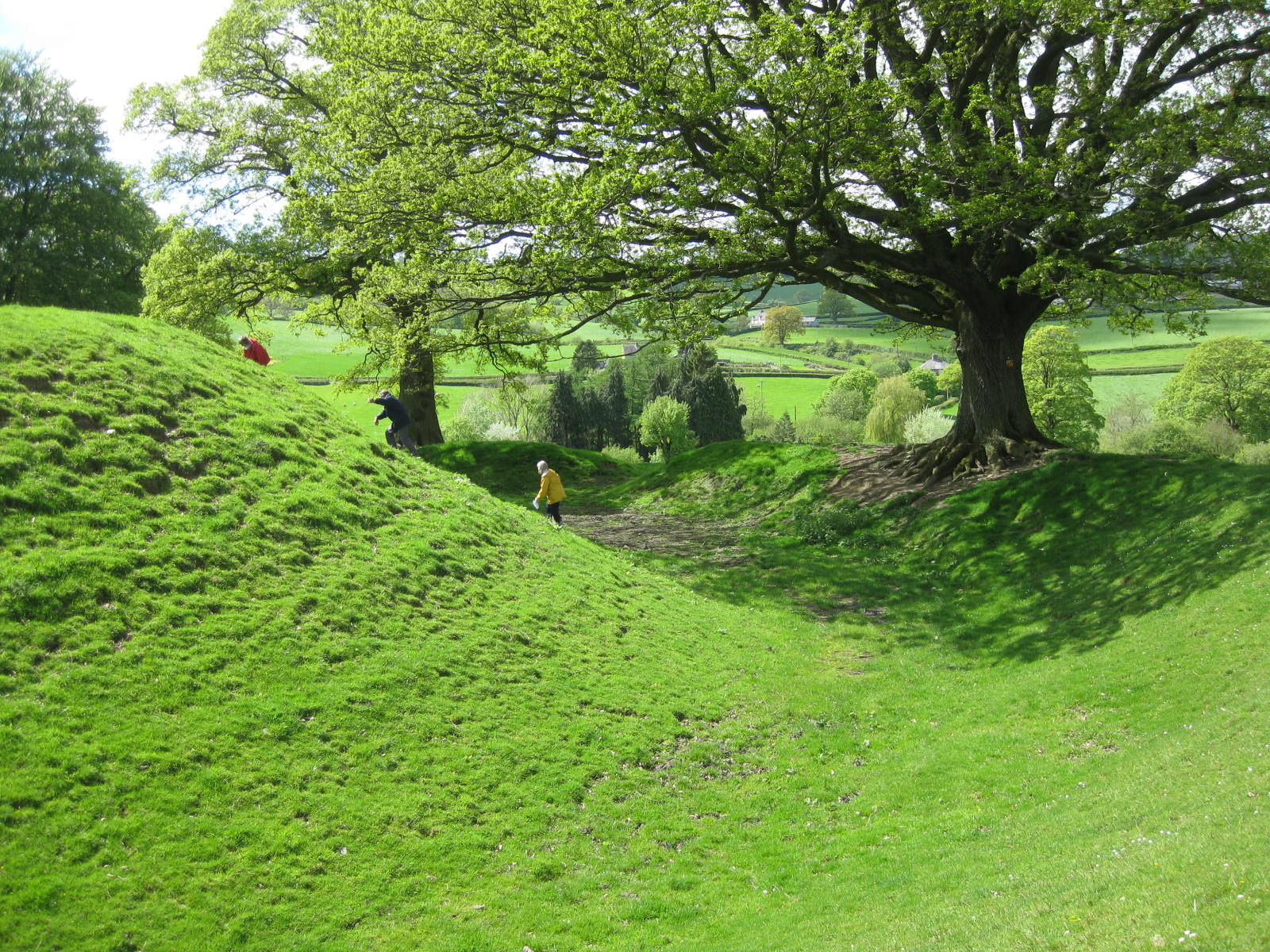
Sycharth, Motte and bank on N side.

== See also ==
- Buildings associated with Owain Glyndŵr

== Literature ==
- Burnham, Helen, A Guide to Ancient and Historic Wales: Clwyd and Powys, 1995, CADW/HMSO
- Davies, R R, The Revolt of Owain Glyndwr, 1995
- Hague, Douglas & Warhurst, Cynthia, Excavations at Sycharth Castle, Denbighshire 1962–3, "Archaeologia Cambrensis" 1966 vol. 115, 108–27
- Higham, Robert & Barker, Philip, Timber Castles, Batsford, London, 1992
- Johnston Dafydd, Iolo Goch: The Poems, Gomer Welsh Classics Series, Llandysul, 1993.
- Richards, R., The mediaeval castles of north Montgomeryshire: a topographical survey. "Montgomeryshire Collections" 1942, Vol. 47 p. 164-82
- Richards, R., 'Sycharth' " Montgomeryshire Collections' 1948, Vol. 50 p. 183-8
- Smith, Spencer Gavin, Report on the Geophysical and Historical Survey at Sycharth Motte and Bailey, "Transactions of the Denbighshire Historical Society", Vol 52, 2003, pp17–36
