= David Hanmer =

Sir David Hanmer KS SL

Justiciar of South Wales
- In office 11 September 1381 – 7 October 1381
- Monarch: Richard of Bordeaux
- Preceded by: David Cradoc
- Succeeded by: Robert de Malley

Deputy-justiciar of South Wales
- In office c. 1385–1386
- Monarch: Richard II of England
- Preceded by: Rhydderch ab Ieuan Llwyd
- Succeeded by: Thomas Rede
- Died: 1387
- Burial: All Saints' Church, Gresford
- Spouse: Angharad ferch Llwyelyn Ddu
- Issue: John Hanmer; Richard Hanmer; Edward Hanmer; Margaret Hanmer
- Father: Philip Hanmer
- Mother: Nest ferch Dafydd

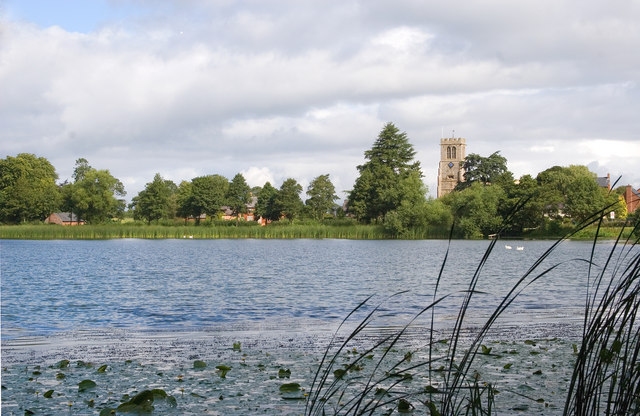
Hanmer Mere and the Church of St Chad in the village of Hanmer

Sir David Hanmer, KS, SL (c.1332–1387) was a fourteenth century Anglo-Welsh Justice of the King's Bench from Hanmer, Wales, best known as Owain Glyndŵr's father-in-law and the father of Glyndŵr's chief supporters.

== Career ==
After being called to the bar, Hanmer is recorded as having served as advocate in a case involving a breach of contract between a lessor and the lessee regarding the lessor's failure to make proper repairs to the leased property. In 1376, Hanmer was appointed a serjeant-at-law. As a contemporary of Chaucer, a rough portrait of Hanmer as a serjeant-at-law may be found in Chaucer's depiction of the Sergeant of the Lawe in the Canterbury Tales. In 1377, Hanmer was elevated to the position of King's Serjeant. He served the Crown in that capacity as a legal adviser to Richard II and Richard's government, represented the king in court, served as a prosecutor in criminal cases and a representative in civil ones, and held a higher rank and power in the lower courts. In his first year as a King's Serjeant, Hanmer sat in Parliament with Sir John Cavendish and others of the judiciary in judgment on a case involving a grant of the late king's grant to the widowed Countess of Huntingdon, said by some to have been Elizabeth of Lancaster, but was more probably the widow of the famous Guichard d'Angle.

On 26 February 1383, Hanmer was appointed the sole Justice of the King's Bench. The position was one of the highest to which an attorney could aspire. From 1383 through 1387, Hanmer was summoned to and sat in Parliament as one of the triers of petitions in the House of Lords. Hanmer's fellow triers included Thomas of Woodstock, Constable of England; Henry le Despenser, Bishop of Norwich; Walter Baron Fitzwalter (d. 1386); and Baron Cobham of Kent (d. 1408). Other triers of petitions included John Bokyngham, Bishop of Lincoln, and Robert de Vere, Earl of Oxford.

David Hanmer was knighted by Richard II in 1387. His name ceased to appear amongst the judges toward the end of that year, and he was certainly dead by 1388, pursuant to a deed of that year concerning his widow Angharad, Lady Hanmer, which names their son-in-law, Owain Glyndŵr, as the trustee for Sir David's estate.

== Forebears and family ==
Following the death of Llywelyn ap Gruffudd, last sovereign Prince of Wales, and the subsequent conquest of Wales, Sir Thomas de Macclesfield (b. 1242), an officer of Edward I, received a grant of lands in Maelor Saesneg (now part of the Wrexham County Borough). Sir Thomas and his heirs also received grants of lands near "Cronemoss" (Cronymoor) in Hanmer, from which the family eventually took its name. He and his successors married Welsh heiresses through whom the family acquired more estates in Hanmer, Bettisfield, Halton, and Pentrepant in the parish of Sylatyn, near Oswestry. Sir Thomas's oldest son, Jordan, inherited family lands in Worthenbury, whilst his younger son, John of Upton (1277–1309), Constable of Caernarfon Castle, resided at and inherited Hanmer and was the first to use the family surname.

John married Hawis ferch Einion, a descendant of the Welsh rulers of mid-Wales; Hawis's grandfather was Gruffudd (d. 1286) ap Gwenwynwyn (d. 1216) ab Owain Cyfeiliog, prince of Powys. Hawis's paternal grandmother and namesake was a daughter of John Lestrange of Knockin, from whose family Sir David's son-in-law, Owain Glyndŵr, descended. David's father was Philip Hanmer (b. 1305), son of John and Hawis, through whom David and his famous son-in-law were distantly related.

Another familial connection between the Hanmers and Owain Glyndŵr was through David's mother, Nest, daughter of Dafydd ap Rhirid ab Ynyr ab Ionas of Maelor Saesneg (English Maelor). Nest's paternal forebear, Ionas, was an illegitimate son of Goronwy ap Tudor ap Rhys Sais, whose descendants, the sons of Tudor ap Goronwy of Anglesey, were first cousins and prominent supporters of Owain Glyndŵr. Thus, Sir David and his famous son-in-law were related by blood several times over.

David married Angharad, daughter of Llywelyn Ddu ap Gruffudd ab Iorwerth Foel of Pengwen, a landowner in nearby Chirkland. Angharad bore David at least four children: three sons, Gruffudd, Philip, and John (b.c.1362), and a daughter, Margaret, or Marred, (b.c.1370). All four of David's children were most certainly Welsh-speaking, as well as fluent in French, and possibly, to a lesser degree, in English. David Hanmer may have had the wardship of Owain Glyndŵr when the latter's father died in his youth. Gruffudd, the eldest, an attorney, was appointed by his brother-in-law as acting legal advisor to the Principality of North Wales; he married Gwerfyl ferch Tudor ap Goronwy, an aunt of Owen Tudor, by whom he had a daughter named Angharad. Philip, the second son, was also probably a lawyer. John was appointed to several responsible posts in the government of Flintshire; he married, first, Margaret ferch Dafydd ap Bleddyn Fychan, by whom he had a son, Gruffydd, from whom descended the Hanmer baronets; his second wife was Efa ferch Dafydd ap Goronwy, by whom he had three sons, John, Richard, and Edward. David's daughter Margaret married Owain Glyndŵr, to whom she bore some nine children.

== Ancestry ==
Ancestors of David Hanmer

Sir Thomas de Macclesfield of Hamner
John Hanmer (1277–1309)
Philip Hanmer (b. 1305)
Einion ap Gruffydd ap Gwenwynwyn of Powys
Hawis ferch Einion
David Hanmer
Rhirid ab Ynyr ab Ionas
Dafydd ap Rhirid
Nest (Agnes) ferch Dafydd ap Rhirid
Ednyfed ab Iorwerth
Gwynhwyfar ferch Ednyfed

== Connection between the Hanmers, Glyndŵr, and the Mortimers ==
Owain Glyndŵr, the Hanmers and the Mortimers

Phylip Hanmer
Sir David Hanmer; Cefnogi OGD d. 1387	Angharad daughter of Llywelyn Ddu
Owain Glyndŵr; Prince of Wales	Margaret Hanmer; Princess of Wales d. 1420	John Hanmer; Supported Glyndŵr	Phylip Hanmer; Supported Glyndŵr	Gruffudd Hanmer; Supported Glyndŵr
Gruffudd ab Owain Glyndŵr d. 1412	Maredudd ab Owain Glyndŵr; Still alive in 1421	Catrin ferch Owain Glyndŵr d. 1413	Edmund Mortimer; Supported Glyndŵr d. 1409	Roger Mortimer; 4th Earl of March d. 1398
