= John Scudamore (landowner) =

Sir John Scudamore was a 15th-century English landowner from Herefordshire who acted as constable and steward of a number of Royal castles in South Wales. Active in fighting with the Welsh in 1402, he was still living in 1432, when it was discovered that he had married a daughter of Owain Glyndŵr.

== Family background ==
A Scudamore received lands allotted him by the new Norman King, William the Conqueror, in the 11th century after the defeat of Harold Godwinson in 1066. He received the demesne of 'Sancta Keyna' as recorded in the Domesday Book, later called Kenchirche, which evolved into Kentchurch. The Scudamore family split into two lines over the generations and centuries, one line based at Holme Lacy and the other line based at Kentchurch.

The Holme Lacy line were anti-Welsh and opponents of the Welsh rising under Owain Glyndŵr. The Kentchurch line were more sympathetic to the Welsh grievances, possibly because their geographical location, closer to Wales, enabled a greater understanding and knowledge of the people and their culture first hand.

In the 13th century, through marriage they also inherited property and land within the Lordship of Abergavenny, at Troy, very near Monmouth. A Sir Alan Scudamore married the sole heiress of Troy House. A Philip Scudamore of Troy became a leader of some of Owain Glyndŵr's forces and was captured at Shrewsbury in 1409 and beheaded for his part in the rebellion.

A branch of the Scudamore family later achieved prominence through agricultural developments in the seventeenth century.

== Officer of the Crown ==
Sir John Scudamore held lands in Ewyas, Kentchurch and Holme Lacy and was the Deputy Squire of King Henry IV's Lordship of Brecon.

In 1402 Sir John Scudamore was actively defending Carreg Cennen Castle in Carmarthenshire against Welsh forces and actually repelling successive onslaughts of Owain Glyndŵr. The siege lasted one whole year and considerable damage was inflicted on the castle – in 1416 the repair bills record that the walls had been 'destroyed and thrown down by rebels'. He is recorded as referring to Owain Glyndŵr as a 'false traytor' at this time. The castle didn't fall to the Welsh. Sir John Scudamore as constable of the castle wrote to John Fairford, the Receiver at Brecon: "He (Owain) lay last night at Dryslwyn with Rhys ab Gruffydd, and there I was and spoke to him upon Wales and prayed for a safe conduct under his seal, to send home my wife and her mother and their company, and he would none grant me".

== Secret marriage ==
Sir John Scudamore married one of the daughters of Owain Glyndŵr, Alys. When this marriage, to a Welsh woman and the daughter of the rebel himself, came to the notice of the government of King Henry VI in 1432, it summarily stripped Sir John Scudamore of the honours he held at that time as steward of the castles of Monmouth, Grosmont and White Castle.

== Harbourers of Glyndŵr ==
It has been postulated that Sir John Scudamore and Alys were the harbourers of Owain Glyndŵr after his disappearance after 1412 and kept him in his final years in secret on their estates. Their ability to keep their marriage and Alys's identity secret from the wider world for over twenty years gives credence to this possibility.
