= Alys ferch Owain Glyndŵr =

Welsh royalty

Alys ferch Owain Glyndŵr was one of the daughters of Margaret Hanmer and Owain Glyndŵr, the disinherited prince of the old Welsh royal house of Powys Fadog, who led a major revolt in Wales between 1400 and ca. 1416 against King Henry IV of England.

Little is known about any of the children of Owain Glyndŵr.

== Marriage to a sheriff of Herefordshire ==
Alys is known to have married Sir John Scudamore, a sheriff of Herefordshire. A secret marriage would have been feasible for an influential man, well connected at all levels, in his family heartlands, where local bonds maybe count for more than the rule of law and outside legislators.

== Glyndwr's harbourers ==
It is rumoured and postulated that they sheltered Owain Glyndŵr during the last years of his life when he disappeared, avoided capture, was not betrayed despite large rewards, ignored successive Royal pardons offered by King Henry V and was reputedly disguised as a family Chaplain and children's tutor.

Miraculously her family managed to weather the storm following her father's revolt and lived in seclusion in the region between the Wye Valley and River Monnow valley in Herefordshire between Abergavenny and Hereford near the Golden Valley, Herefordshire.

== Modern descendants ==
Their descendants continue to live to this day in Kentchurch on the modern-day England/Wales border almost exactly halfway between Abergavenny and Hereford near the River Monnow.

In 1999, it was claimed that they knew the precise whereabouts of Glyndŵr's secret grave.

In 2006, the Owain Glyndwr Society's president Adrien Jones said: "Four years ago we visited a direct descendant of Glyndwr, a John Lucas-Scudamore, at Kentchurch Court, near Abergavenny. He took us to Mornington Straddle, in Herefordshire, where one of Glyndwr's daughters, Alice, lived. Mr Lucas-Scudamore told us that he (Glyndŵr) spent his last days there and eventually died there.... It was a family secret for six hundred years and even Mr. Skidmore's mother, who died shortly before we visited, refused to reveal the secret. There's even a mound where he is believed to be buried at Mornington Straddle."
