= Iolo Goch =

Welsh bard

Iolo Goch (c. 1320 – c. 1398) (meaning Iolo the Red in English) was a medieval Welsh bard who composed poems addressed to Owain Glyndŵr, among others.

== Lineage ==
Iolo was the son of Ithel Goch ap Cynwrig ap Iorwerth Ddu ap Cynwrig Ddewis Herod ap Cywryd and was born in the manor of Lleweni in the Vale of Clwyd where his father rented a small portion of the family's ancient patrimony, possessed a dwelling house and also rented small parcels of land belonging to the manors of Llechryd and Berain, near Denbigh. A local 19th-century source says Iolo lived at a certain "Coed y Pantwn in Llechryd". George Borrow refers to this but mislocates it in the upper Clwyd valley. There is no medieval evidence for the local tradition.

== Patrons ==
He is notable as one of the finest exponents of the metrical form known as the cywydd. He composed poems to a number of Welsh noblemen, notably to his chief patron Ithel ap Robert, an archdeacon of St Asaph who lived near Caerwys, and also a poem to King Edward III of England, which shows a detailed knowledge of places and battles in England, Ireland and France during this period and possibly written in 1347.

One of his three poems composed for Owain Glyndŵr includes a vivid description of Owain's hall at Sycharth. They were clearly composed before Owain's rebellion. He also composed a notable poem known as Y Llafurwr ("The Labourer").

== See also ==
- Iolo Goch at Wikisource
- Medieval Welsh literature
