= Catrin ferch Owain Glyndŵr =

Daughter of Owain Glyndŵr

- Lady Mortimer
- Died: 1413
- Spouse: Edmund Mortimer
- Issue: Lionel; 3 daughters
- House: Mathrafal
- Father: Owain Glyndŵr
- Mother: Margaret Hanmer

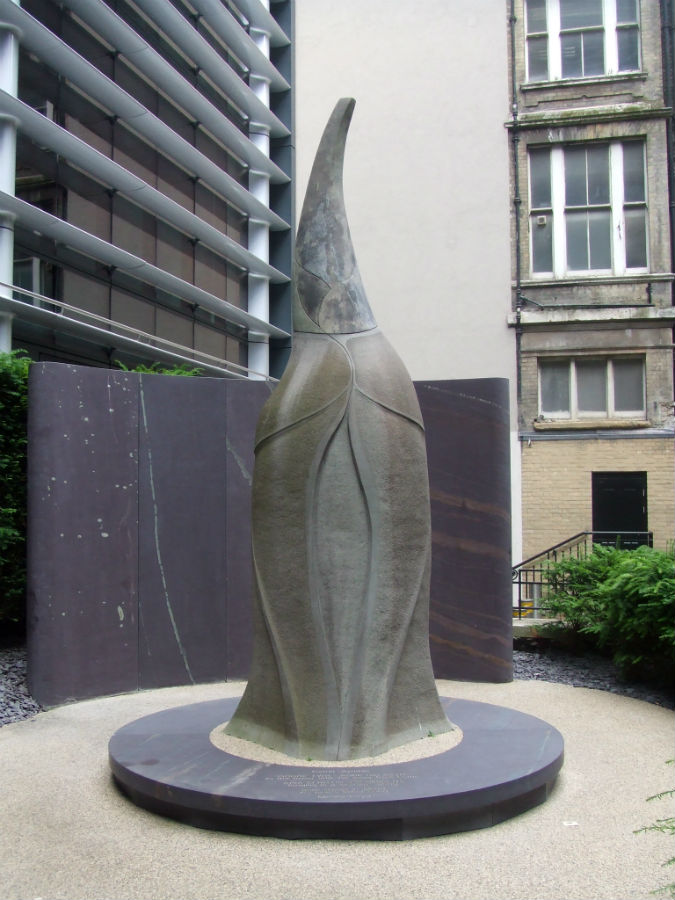
Catrin ferch Owain Glyndŵr, the memorial to Catrin in St Swithin's Church Garden, City of London.

Catrin ferch Owain Glyndŵr (died 1413) was one of the daughters (probably the eldest) of Margaret Hanmer and Owain Glyndŵr, and her marriage to a claimant on the English throne was used by her father to gain support. (Note: Glyndŵr, a prince of the old Welsh royal house of Powys Fadog of the Mathrafal line, led a major revolt in Wales between 1400 and c.1416, taking the title of "Prince of Wales".)

== Biography ==
Catrin is one of the children of Owain Glyndŵr about whom most is known. In November 1402, she married Edmund Mortimer, an unransomed hostage who entered into an alliance with her father.

Edmund Mortimer died during the siege of Harlech Castle in 1409, of unknown causes. Catrin was subsequently captured alongside her three daughters. They, as well as her mother and one of her sisters, were taken to the Tower of London. The deaths of Catrin and her daughters are recorded, and their burial at St Swithin's Church in London, but the cause of their deaths is not known.

== Legacy ==
A memorial to Catrin stands in St Swithin's Church Garden, where the church formerly stood; the statue was designed by Nic Stradlyn-John and sculpted by Richard Renshaw, and was unveiled in 2001 by Siân Phillips.

Her mother's fate is not known; it is known only that Margaret Hanmer outlived Catrin. In 2003 an exhibition was held at the National Library of Wales to celebrate Catrin's legacy, and a short poem was composed in her memory by Menna Elfyn. A play, Catrin Glyndwr by Heledd Bianchi, was premièred in 2004.

== Family connections ==
Owain Glyndŵr, the Hanmers and the Mortimers

Phylip Hanmer
Sir David Hanmer; Cefnogi OGD d. 1387	Angharad daughter of Llywelyn Ddu
Owain Glyndŵr; Prince of Wales	Margaret Hanmer; Princess of Wales d. 1420	John Hanmer; Supported Glyndŵr	Phylip Hanmer; Supported Glyndŵr	Gruffudd Hanmer; Supported Glyndŵr
Gruffudd ab Owain Glyndŵr d. 1412	Maredudd ab Owain Glyndŵr; Still alive in 1421	Catrin ferch Owain Glyndŵr d. 1413	Edmund Mortimer; Supported Glyndŵr d. 1409	Roger Mortimer; 4th Earl of March d. 1398
