= Edmund Mortimer (rebel) =

14th/15th-century English nobleman

Edmund Mortimer IV
- Born: 10 December 1376; Ludlow Castle, Shropshire, England
- Died: January 1409 (aged 32); Harlech Castle, Wales
- Family: Mortimer
- Spouse: Catrin ferch Owain Glyndŵr (1402)
- Father: Edmund Mortimer, 3rd Earl of March
- Mother: Philippa, 5th Countess of Ulster

Arms of the Earl of March

Sir Edmund Mortimer IV (10 December 1376 – January 1409) was an English nobleman and landowner who played a part in the rebellions of the Welsh leader Owain Glyndŵr and of the Percy family against King Henry IV, at the beginning of the 15th century. He died at the siege of Harlech as part of these conflicts. He was related to many members of the English royal family through his mother, Princess Philippa, Countess of Ulster, who was a granddaughter of King Edward III.

== Family ==
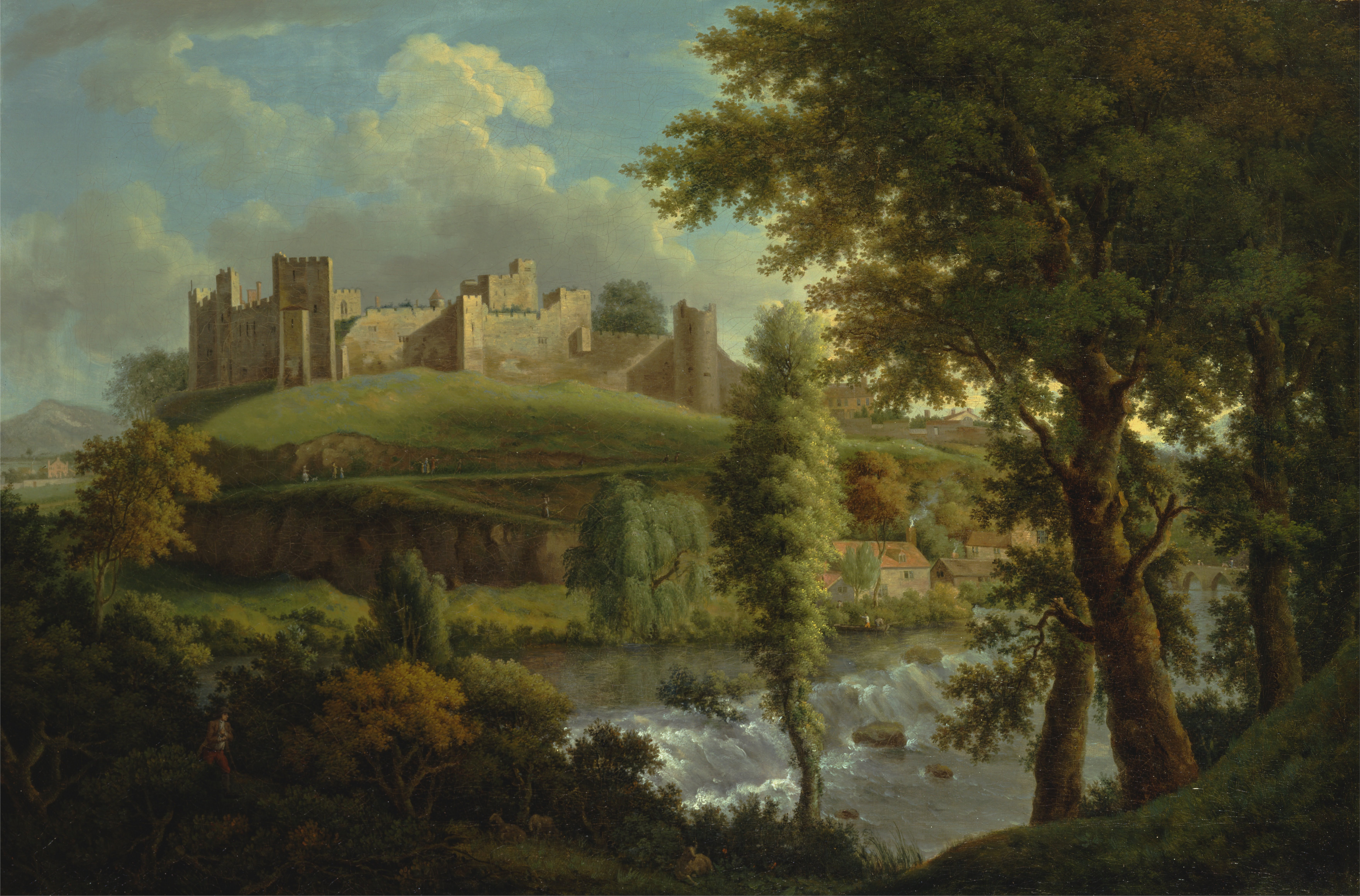
Ludlow Castle, family seat and birthplace of Edmund Mortimer

Edmund IV was born on 10 December 1376 at Ludlow Castle in Shropshire as the second son of Edmund Mortimer, 3rd Earl of March, by his wife, princess Philippa Plantagenet. He was a grandson of prince Lionel of Antwerp, Duke of Clarence, thus a great-grandson of King Edward III. His grandfather Lionel was previously married to Violante Visconti, sister of Gian Galeazzo Visconti, the Duke of Milan. Both were members of the House of Visconti and the Royal House of Savoy.

Edmund Mortimer had an elder brother, Roger Mortimer, 4th Earl of March, and two sisters, Elizabeth, who married Henry 'Hotspur' Percy, and Philippa, who married firstly John Hastings, 3rd Earl of Pembroke, secondly Richard Fitzalan, 11th Earl of Arundel, and thirdly, Sir Thomas Poynings.

Edmund was financially well provided for, both by his father, who died when Edmund was 5 years old, and by his elder brother Roger.

Edmund was a supporter of his cousin, Henry Bolingbroke, later King Henry IV of England, in spite of the fact that his older brother Roger had a stronger genealogical claim to the throne by reason of the fact that he and his brother were grandsons of Lionel of Antwerp, King Edward III's second surviving son, whereas Bolingbroke's father, John of Gaunt, 1st Duke of Lancaster, was King Edward III's third surviving son.

When his elder brother Roger was slain in a skirmish at Kells in Ireland on 20 July 1398, Edmund became responsible for protecting the interests of Roger's young son, Edmund Mortimer, 5th Earl of March, who also had a claim to the throne as heir to his father.

== Capture by Owain Glyndŵr ==
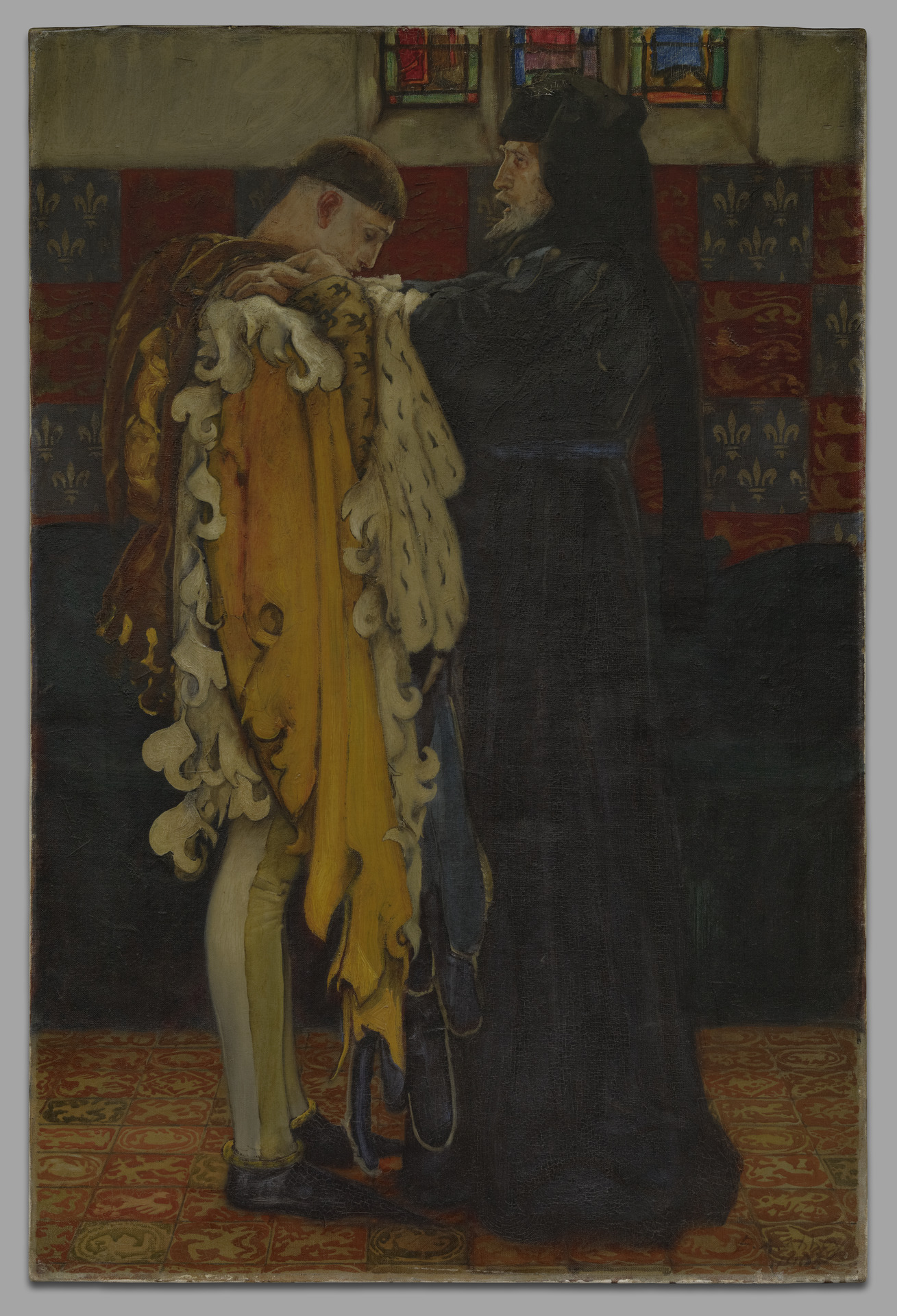
King Henry IV, Part I, Shakespeare's play

Both Edmund Mortimer and his brother-in-law Henry 'Hotspur' Percy fought for Henry IV against the Welsh rebel leader Owain Glyndŵr. However, at the Battle of Bryn Glas on 22 June 1402, Mortimer was defeated, allegedly because some of his Welsh forces defected, and he was taken prisoner.

King Henry's suspicions were fuelled by rumours that Mortimer had fallen into captivity by his own design. He forbade the Percys to seek their kinsman's ransom, and by October 1402 began seizing Mortimer's estates, plate and jewels. Mortimer thereupon transferred his allegiance to Glyndŵr. On 30 November 1402, he married Glyndŵr's daughter Catrin, and on 13 December 1402 proclaimed in writing that he had joined Glyndŵr in his efforts to restore King Richard II to the throne, if alive, and if dead, to make his nephew Edmund Mortimer, 5th Earl of March, King of England.

In the summer of 1403, the Percys rebelled and took up arms against the king. According to J. M. W. Bean, it is clear that the Percys were in collusion with Glyndŵr. Mortimer's brother-in-law Henry 'Hotspur' Percy and Hotspur's uncle, Thomas Percy, 1st Earl of Worcester, moved south with their army. However, Hotspur's father, Henry Percy, 1st Earl of Northumberland, was, for reasons never fully explained, slow to move south with his army. Hotspur and Worcester met Henry IV's forces at the Battle of Shrewsbury on 21 July 1403 without Northumberland's assistance. They were defeated; Hotspur was slain, and Worcester was executed two days later.

The alliance of Glyndŵr and Edmund Mortimer with the Percys survived the setback at Shrewsbury. In February 1405, Glyndŵr, Mortimer, and Northumberland entered into the Tripartite Indenture, which proposed a threefold division of the kingdom. Mortimer was to have most of the south of England. This agreement was apparently connected to the attempted abduction of Mortimer's nephew Edmund in the same month and Northumberland's second rising in May 1405.

However, after Shrewsbury, Glyndŵr's attacks on the king's forces were largely unsuccessful, and according to T. F. Tout, "Mortimer himself was reduced to great distress". He died in 1409, either during or shortly after the eight-month siege of Glyndŵr's stronghold of Harlech Castle by Henry IV's son, Henry, Prince of Wales, where he was "killed in the fighting".

Edmund Mortimer and his wife Catrin had one son, Lionel, and three daughters. After Mortimer's death, the king had Catrin and her daughters brought to London, where they were held in custody. In 1413, she and two of her daughters were buried at St Swithin, London Stone.

=== Shakespeare and Sir Edmund Mortimer ===
Events in the life of Sir Edmund Mortimer were dramatised by Shakespeare in Henry IV, Part 1 (c. 1597). In the play, Shakespeare accurately identifies him as Hotspur's brother-in-law, but simultaneously conflates him with his nephew by referring to him as "Earl of March". He was famously played by Junius Brutus Booth, who was John Wilkes Booth’s father.

== Ancestry ==
Ancestors of Edmund Mortimer (rebel)

16. Roger Mortimer, 1st Earl of March
8. Sir Edmund Mortimer
17. Joan de Geneville, Baroness Geneville
4. Roger Mortimer, 2nd Earl of March
18. Bartholomew de Badlesmere, 1st Baron Badlesmere
9. Elizabeth de Badlesmere
19. Margaret de Clare, Lady Badlesmere
2. Edmund Mortimer, 3rd Earl of March
20. William Montagu, 2nd Baron Montagu
10. William Montacute, 1st Earl of Salisbury
21. Elizabeth Montfort
5. Philippa Montacute
22. William de Grandison, 1st Baron Grandison
11. Catherine Montacute, Countess of Salisbury
23. Sibilla Tregoz
1. Edmund Mortimer
24. Edward II of England
12. Edward III of England
25. Isabella of France
6. Lionel of Antwerp, 1st Duke of Clarence
26. William I, Count of Hainaut
13. Philippa of Hainault
27. Joan of Valois
3. Philippa of Clarence, 5th Countess of Ulster
28. John de Burgh
14. William Donn de Burgh, 3rd Earl of Ulster
29. Elizabeth de Clare
7. Elizabeth de Burgh, 4th Countess of Ulster
30. Henry, 3rd Earl of Lancaster
15. Maud of Lancaster
31. Maud Chaworth

== Family connections ==
Owain Glyndŵr, the Hanmers and the Mortimers

Phylip Hanmer
Sir David Hanmer; Cefnogi OGD d. 1387 | Angharad daughter of Llywelyn Ddu
Owain Glyndŵr; Prince of Wales | Margaret Hanmer; Princess of Wales d. 1420 | John Hanmer; Supported Glyndŵr | Phylip Hanmer; Supported Glyndŵr | Gruffudd Hanmer; Supported Glyndŵr
Gruffudd ab Owain Glyndŵr d. 1412 | Maredudd ab Owain Glyndŵr; Still alive in 1421 | Catrin ferch Owain Glyndŵr d. 1413 | Edmund Mortimer; Supported Glyndŵr d. 1409 | Roger Mortimer; 4th Earl of March d. 1398
