= Maredudd ab Owain Glyndŵr =

Son of Owain Glyndŵr

Maredudd ab Owain Glyndŵr was a son of Margaret Hanmer and Owain Glyndŵr. He was the last significant active participant in the revolt raised by Glyndŵr in Wales between 1400 and about 1416.

== Early life ==
Little is known about any of the children of Owain Glyndŵr, and Maredudd's date of birth is unknown. He may have been too young to be involved in the early stages of the revolt.

Unlike several of his siblings, Maredudd was not captured by the English in the latter stages of the rebellion. As his father's age and health made it difficult for him to continue a guerilla campaign, Maredudd increasingly became seen as the leader of the remnants of the rebellion by the English, who named him as a principal individual in the pardons offered to surviving rebels.

In 1416 he appears to have been in North Wales, attempting to rally opposition in this area with a force of Scots. He is known to have rejected a royal pardon for both himself and his father in 1417 proffered by officials of King Henry V of England. However, this pardon laid more emphasis on Maredudd than his father, and has frequently been taken by historians as a sign that the English knew his father was dead by this time.

Claims that he became a Lancastrian courtier during this period and fought at Agincourt (on either side) seem to be based on a confusion with a different Maredudd ab Owain. This Maredudd was lord of Cardigan, a supporter of Owain Glyndŵr in the early years of the rebellion, but changed sides and became a loyal supporter of the English crown from 1409, including leading a contingent of his men on the Agincourt campaign.

== Royal pardon ==
Maredudd finally accepted a pardon, for himself alone, in 1421. This is usually given as the formal end-date of the rebellion and the sign of final re-establishment of English control of Wales.
