= Buildings associated with Owain Glyndŵr =

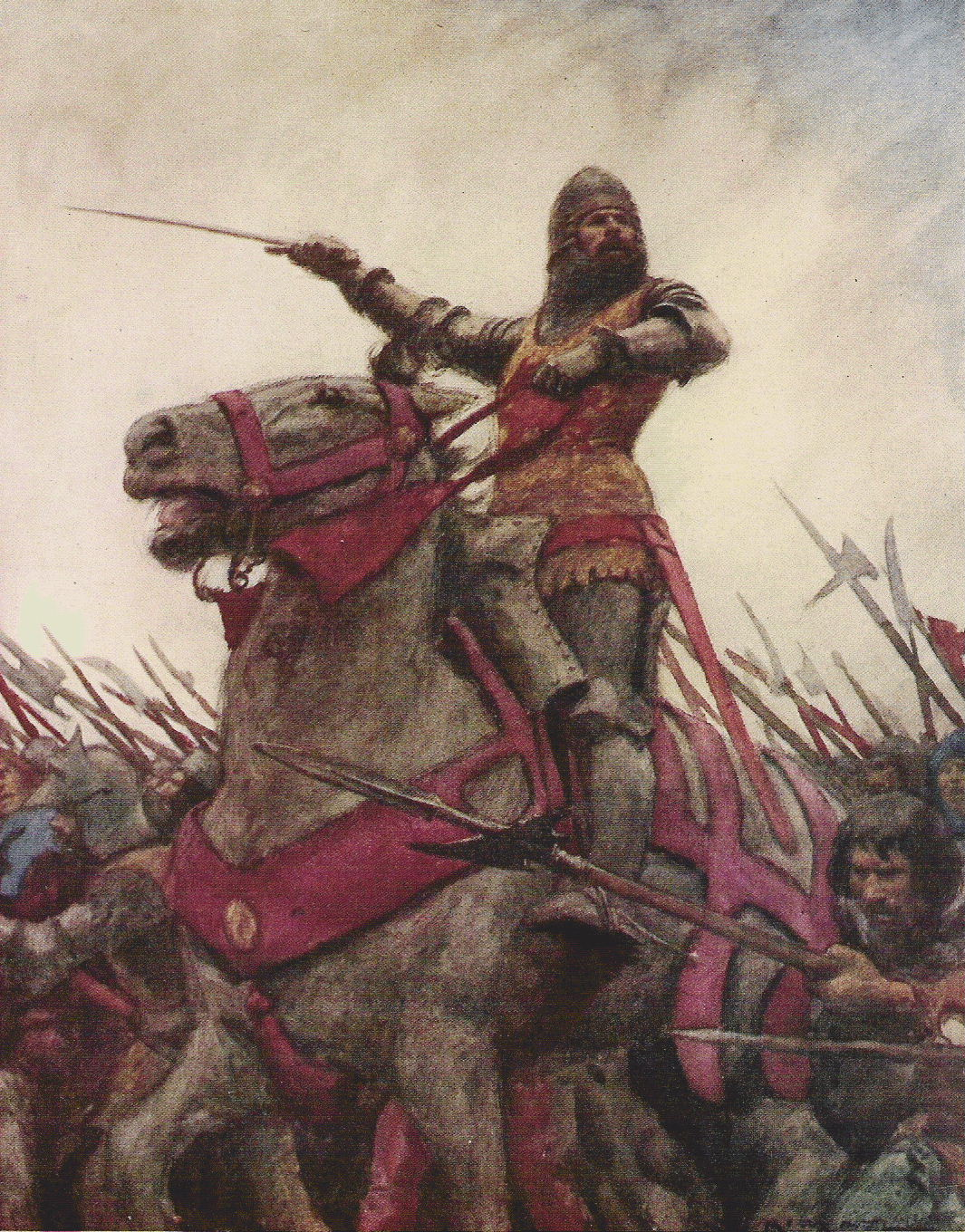
Painting of Glyndwr by A.C. Michael.

There are multiple buildings and sites associated with Owain Glyndwr in Wales.

== Buildings associated with Owain Glyndŵr ==
=== Sycharth ===
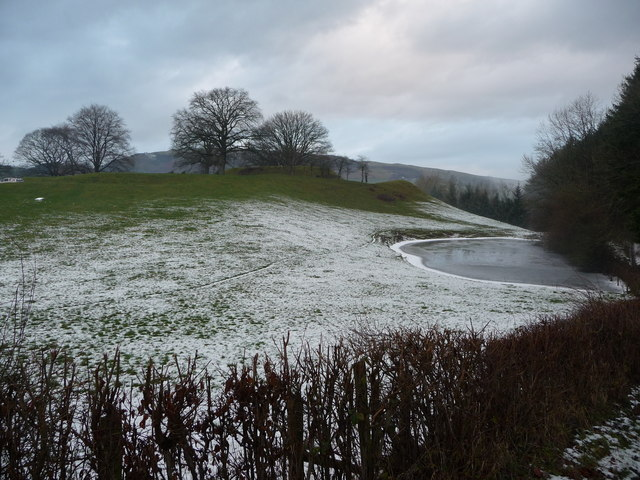
Sycharth

Sycharth is a motte and bailey castle and town in Llansilin, Powys, Wales. Until 1996 Sycharth was in the historic county of Denbighshire, but was then transferred to the Shire area of Montgomeryshire within Powys. Sycharth Castle was the birthplace of Owain Glyndŵr.

Iolo Goch described Sycharth as containing ‘nine plated buildings on the scale of eighteen mansions, fair wooden buildings on top of a green hill’ and ‘a tiled roof on every house with frowning forehead, and a chimney from which the smoke would grow; nine symmetrical, identical halls, and nine wardrobes by each one’.

The castle was situated in the Welsh territory of Powys Fadog which had formed part of the Welsh Kingdom of Powys. Following the Norman Conquest two of the commotes, Cynllaith and Edeyrnion came under the control of the Normans. There seems little doubt that Sycharth or ‘Cynllaith Owain’ was a Motte-and-bailey built by the Normans. An entry in the Domesday Book would indicate that this had taken place before 1086. The Normans also built a castle at Rhug that would have been the centre for Edeyrnion.

=== Machynlleth Parliament house ===
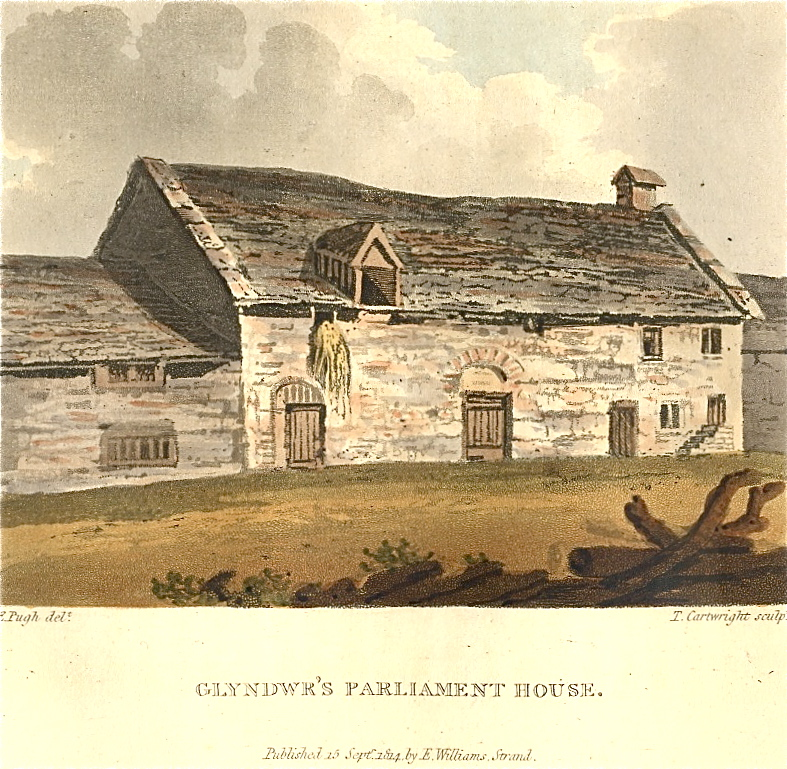
Parliament House, Machynlleth in 1816

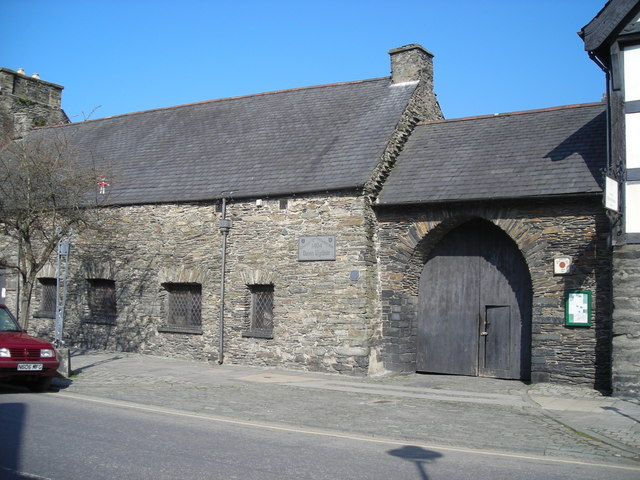
Owain Glyndŵr's parliament house

The best-known building is Owain Glyndŵr's Parliament house in Machynlleth. This building has been substantially altered in more recent times, but fortunately, Edward Pugh published a fine-coloured lithograph of the building in 1816. The Parliament House (Senedd-dy) in Machynlleth is associated with the 1404 Senedd but the present building is more recent. Local tradition is that the stones used came from the original 1404 building.

Recent dendrochronological dating of the felling of a roof timber to 1470 does not rule out an association of the building's stone structure with Owain. The original building is a hall house with a four-unit plan: a storeyed outer room of two bays, an open passage (two bays between partition trusses), an open hall (three bays with dais-end partition), and a storeyed inner room of two bays. The carpentry is refined: purlins and ridge are tenoned into the trusses. The principal rafters of each truss are unusually shaped ('extruded') to receive the tenoned collar. In the hall, the purlins are moulded with two tiers of wind braces (replaced), and the trusses have shaped feet. The upper-end truss is set forward from the dais partition to form a shallow canopy.

=== Dolgellau Parliament House ===
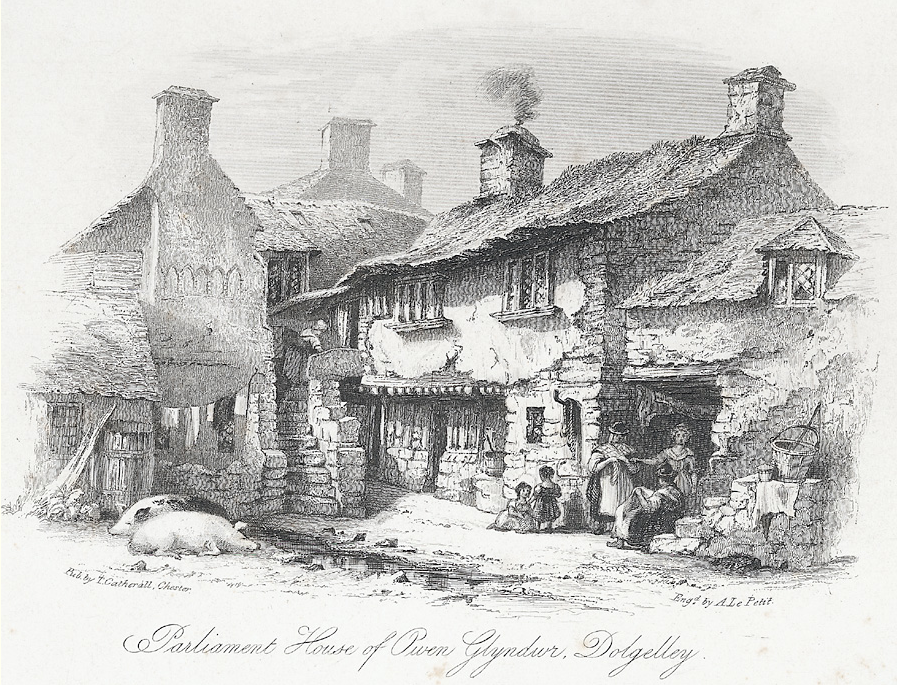
Owen Glyndwr's Parliament House

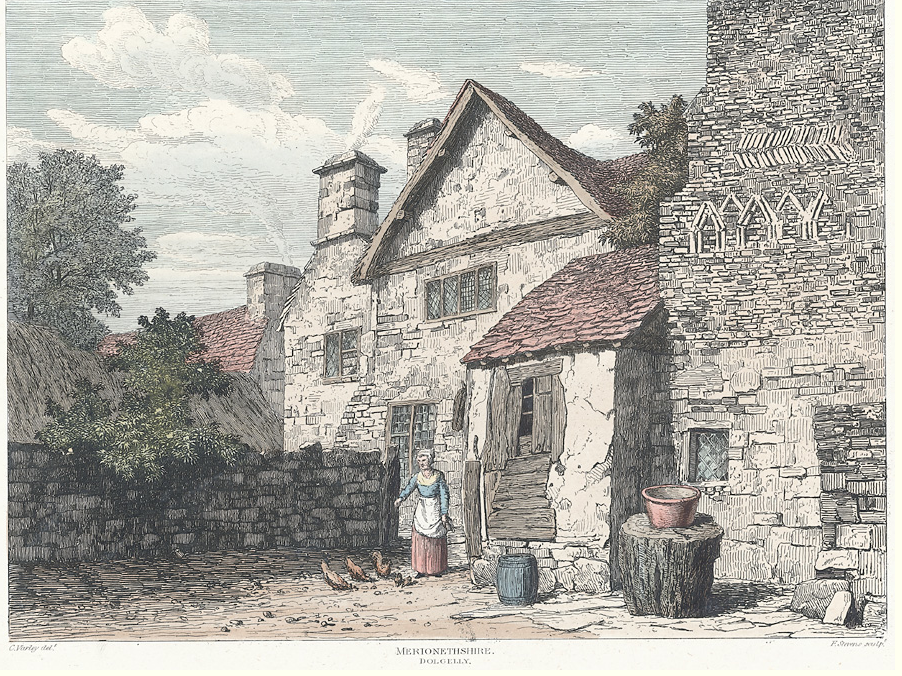
Houses next to Owen Glyndŵr's Parliament House, Dolgellau.

There was another Parliament House of Glyndŵr in the centre of Dolgellau. It was moved in 1885 to Newtown, Powys and re-erected in a much altered form. It may have been first referred to as the Parliament House in 1555. This building is now known as Plas Cwrt yn Dre. It was an aisled hall house, so is likely to have been a building of considerable importance, but is unlikely to date back to the time of Owain. Much restored by A B Phipson for Sir Pryce Pryce-Jones as a two-storey three-bay house. Largely timber framed with stone end walls with interlocking herring-bone decorative framing to a jettied first floor, which is supported by vine scroll brackets. There is an external stone staircase to a plank door at extreme left and square panelled timber framing to ground floor. The right stone bay incorporates re-used medieval masonry and a two-light window with a central stone mullion. Arcade patterns in tile inset to stack may reproduce the arcade designs on the chimney stack shown in a lithograph of 1810 by Cornelius Varley.

=== Pennal Church ===
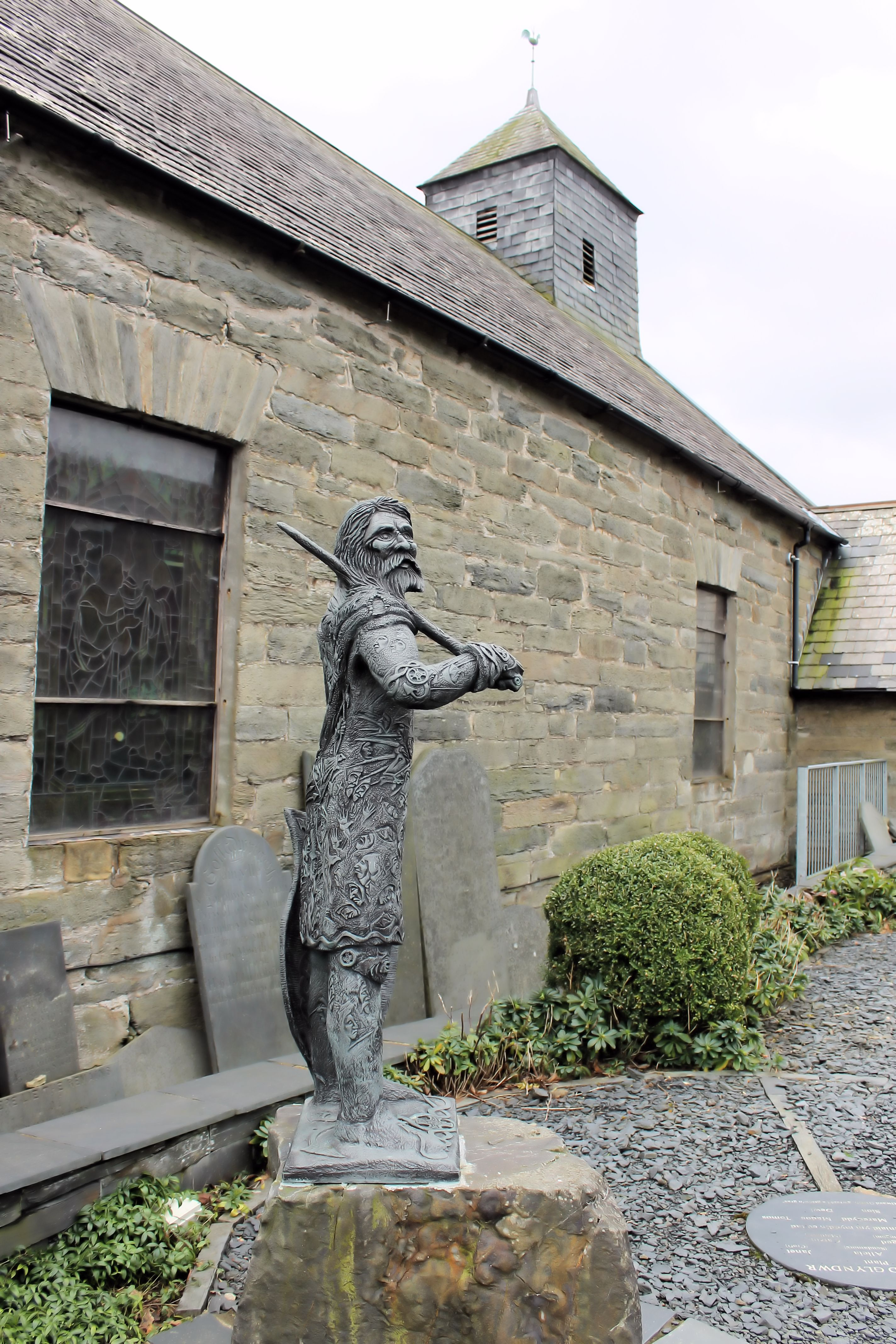
Owain Glyndŵr statue at Pennal church

By 1405, most French forces had withdrawn after politics in Paris shifted toward peace with the Hundred Years' War continuing between England and France. On 31 March 1406 Glyndŵr wrote a letter to be sent to Charles VI King of France during a synod at the Welsh Church at Pennal, hence its name. Glyndŵr's letter requested maintained military support from the French to fend off the English in Wales. Glyndŵr suggested that in return, he would recognise Benedict XIII of Avignon as the Pope. The letter sets out the ambitions of Glyndŵr of an independent Wales with its own parliament, led by himself as Prince of Wales. These ambitions also included the return of the traditional law of Hywel Dda, rather than the enforced English law, establishment of an independent Welsh church as well as two universities, one in south Wales, and one in north Wales.

It is thought that the church was so named by Glyndŵr in competition with the chapel of St Peter ad Vincula in the Tower of London, one of the chapels royal of his rival, King Henry IV of England. Pennal was regarded with honour because of its status as one of the 21 llysoedd, the courts of the native Welsh Princes of Gwynedd.

The church is the last site of the last Senedd meeting held by Owain Glyndŵr.

=== Owain Glyndwr (prison) ===
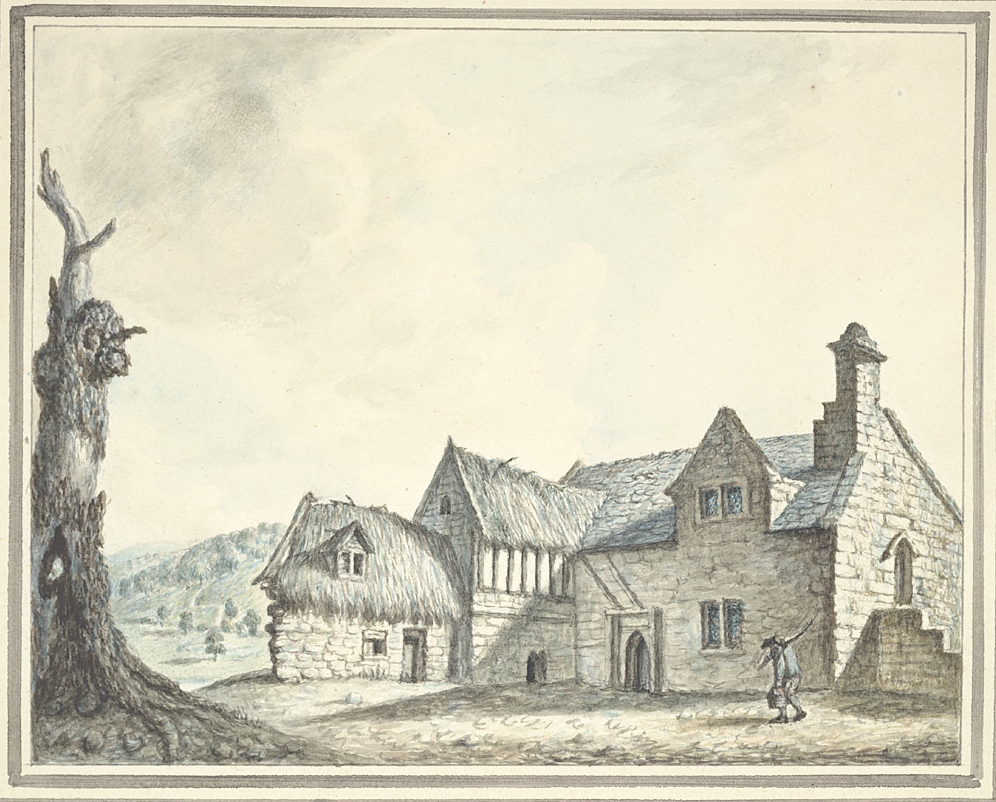
Owen Glyndŵr's Prison, Carrog in 1794.

At Carrog near Corwen parts of Owain's Prison stood, possibly into the 20th century. Thomas Pennant wrote in about 1776 that "The prison where Owen confined his captives was not far from his house, in the parish of Llansantfraid Glyndwrdwy and the place is to this day called 'Carchardy Owen Glyndwrdwy'. Some remains are still to be seen near the church, which forms part of a habitable house. It consists of a room 13 feet square and ten and a half high. The sides consist of three horizontal beams, with upright planks, not four inches asunder, mortised into them. In these are groves in the bottom, as if there had been cross bars or grates. The roof is exceedingly strong, composed of strong planks almost contiguous. It seems as if there had been two stories, but the upper part at present is evidently modern". In 1794 John Ingleby was employed to make a watercolour record of the building, which stood just to the SE of the church and overlooked the River Dee. The building was thatched and has some timber close studding and also a Gothic arched window and Gothic arched doors. There seems to be evidence for an outer stair leading to a first-floor hall, which suggests that parts of the building could well have been contemporary with Owain Glyndŵr. The site of the building was on the modern Glyndŵr Terrace.

=== Mornington Straddle ===
Nothing certain is known of Glyndŵr after 1412. Despite enormous rewards being offered, he was neither captured nor betrayed. He ignored royal pardons. Tradition has it that he died and was buried possibly in the church of Saints Mael and Sulien at Corwen close to his home, or possibly on his estate in Sycharth or on the estates of his daughters' husband: Kentchurch in south Herefordshire or Monnington in west Herefordshire.

In his book The Mystery of Jack of Kent and the Fate of Owain Glyndŵr, Alex Gibbon argues that the folk hero Jack of Kent, also known as Siôn Cent – the family chaplain of the Scudamore family – was, in fact, Owain Glyndŵr himself. Gibbon points out a number of similarities between Siôn Cent and Glyndŵr (including physical appearance, age, education, and character) and claims that Owain spent his last years living with his daughter Alys, passing himself off as an ageing Franciscan friar and family tutor. There are many folk tales of Glyndŵr donning disguises to gain an advantage over opponents during the rebellion.

In 1875, the Rev. Francis Kilvert wrote in his diary that he saw the grave of "Owen Glendower" in the churchyard at Monnington "[h]ard by the church porch and on the western side of it ... It is a flat stone of whitish-grey shaped like a rude obelisk figure, sunk deep into the ground in the middle of an oblong patch of earth from which the turf has been pared away, and, alas, smashed into several fragments."

In 2006, Adrien Jones, the president of the Owain Glyndŵr Society, said, "Four years ago we visited a direct descendant of Glyndŵr, a John Skidmore, at Kentchurch Court, near Abergavenny. He took us to Mornington Straddle, in Herefordshire, where one of Glyndŵr's daughters, Alice, lived. Mr Skidmore told us that he (Glyndŵr) spent his last days there and eventually died there... It was a family secret for 600 years and even Mr Skidmore's mother, who died shortly before we visited, refused to reveal the secret. There's even a mound where he is believed to be buried at Mornington Straddle." Historian Gruffydd Aled Williams suggests in a 2017 monograph that the burial site is in the Kimbolton Chapel near Leominster, the present parish church of St James the Great which used to be the chapelry of Leominster Priory, based upon a number of manuscripts held in the National Archives. Although Kimbolton is an unexceptional and relatively unknown place outside of Herefordshire, it is closely connected to the Scudamore family. Given the existence of other links with Herefordshire, its place within the mystery of Owain Glyndŵr's last days cannot be discounted. As of 2015, his final resting place remains uncertain.

== See also ==
- Owain Glyndwr Hotel
