= Batten =

Construction material

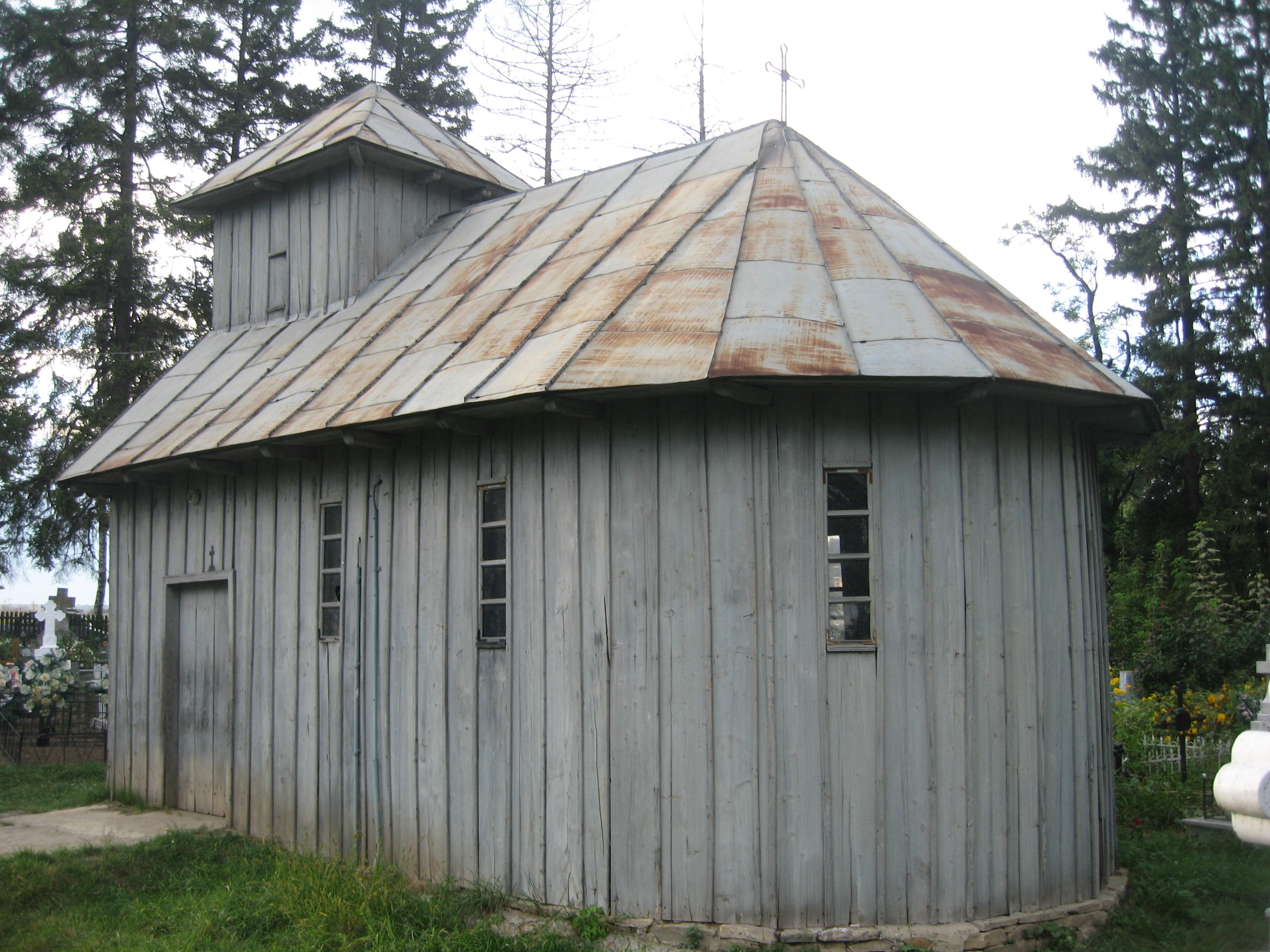
Board and batten siding on a chapel named the Wooden Church (Biserica de lemn) in Zvoriștea, Romania

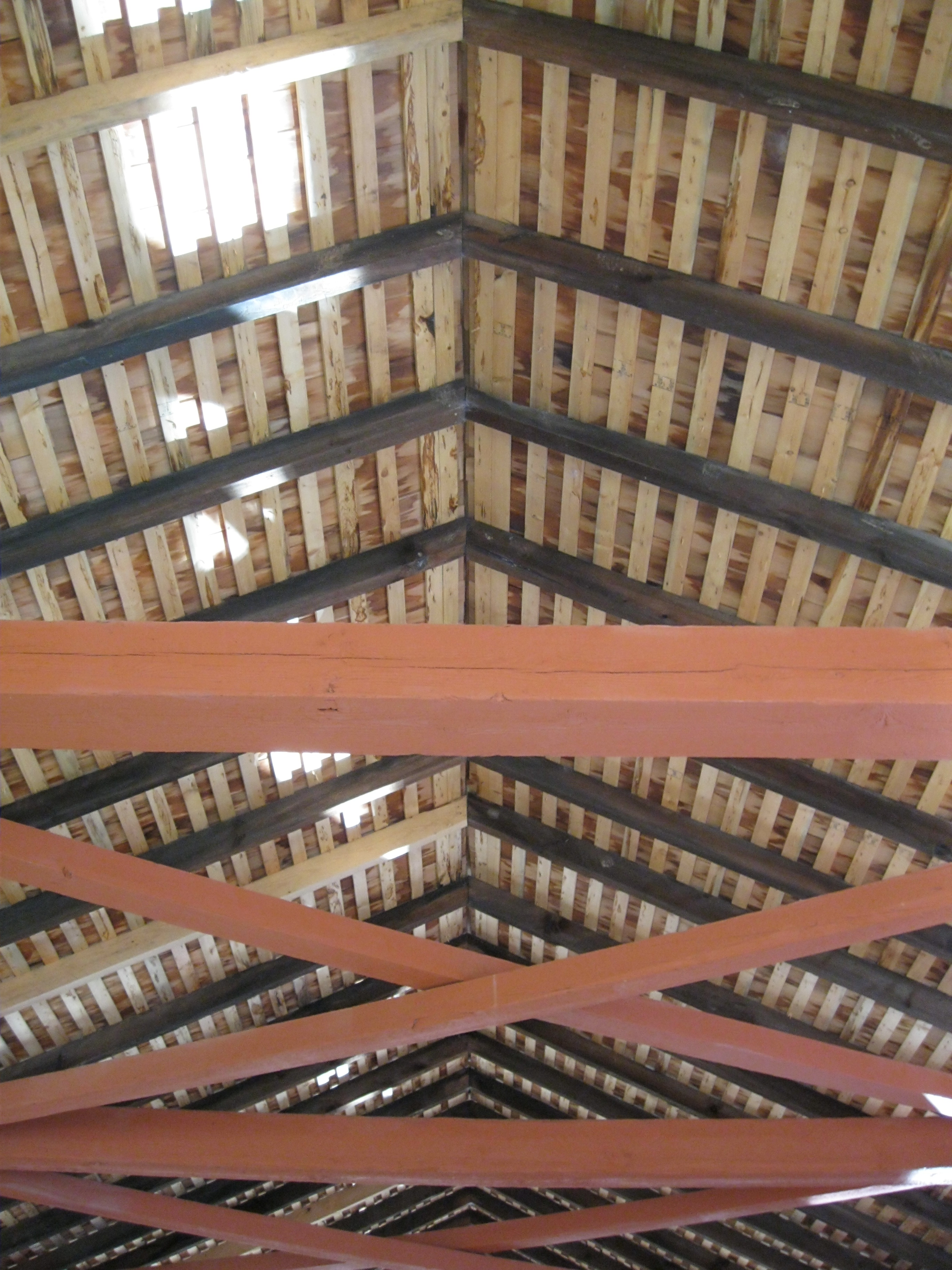
Roofing battens or laths are the light colored strips on the Hillsgrove Covered Bridge, Pennsylvania, U.S.A.

A batten is most commonly a strip of solid material, historically wood but can also be of plastic, metal, or fiberglass. Battens are variously used in construction, sailing, and other fields.

In the lighting industry, battens refer to linear light fittings.

In the steel industry, battens used as furring may also be referred to as "top hats", in reference to the profile of the metal.

== Roofing ==
Roofing battens or battening, also called roofing lath, are used to provide the fixing point for roofing materials such as shingles or tiles. The spacing of the battens on the trusses or rafters depends on the type of roofing material and is applied horizontally like purlins.

Battens are also used in metal roofing to secure the sheets called a batten-seam roof and are covered with a batten roll joint.

Some roofs may use a grid of battens in both directions, known as a counter-batten system, which improves ventilation.

Roofing battens are most commonly made of wood or metal, but can be made of other materials.

== Wall battens ==
Wall battens like roofing battens are used to fix siding materials such as tile or shingles. Rainscreen construction uses battens (furring) as part of a system which allows walls to dry out more quickly than normal.

=== Board-and-batten ===
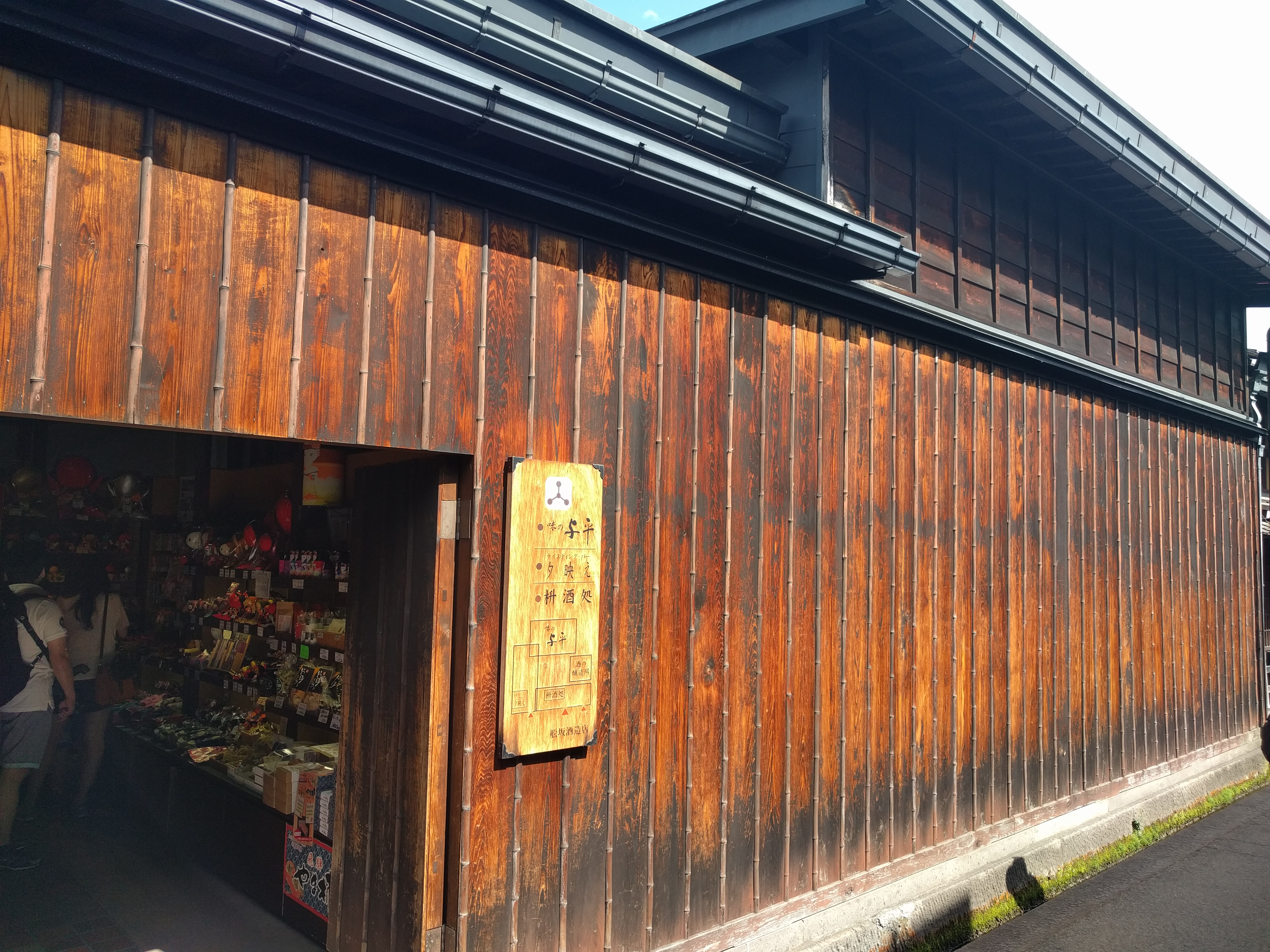
Board-and-batten with bamboo battens

Board-and-batten siding is an exterior treatment of vertical boards with battens covering the seams. Board-and-batten roofing is a type of board roof with battens covering the gaps between boards on a roof as the roofing material. Board-and-batten is also a synonym for single-wall construction, a method of building with vertical, structural boards, the seams sometimes covered with battens.

== Spacers ==
Battens may be used as spacers, sometimes called furring, to raise the surface of a material. In flooring the sometimes large battens support the finish flooring in a similar manner to a joist but with the batten resting on a solid sub-floor as a floating floor and sometimes cushioned.

== Trim ==
Batten trim or batten molding is a thin strip of trim typically with a rectangular cross-section similar to lath used in lattice, used to cover seams between panels of exterior siding or interior paneling.

== Flooring ==
In flooring a batten may be relatively large, up to 2.5 inches (6.4 cm) thick by 7 inches (18 cm) wide and more than 6 feet (1.8 m) long.

Battens may also be used to secure carpet in place, where they are sometimes referred to as "gripper strips".

== Batten doors ==
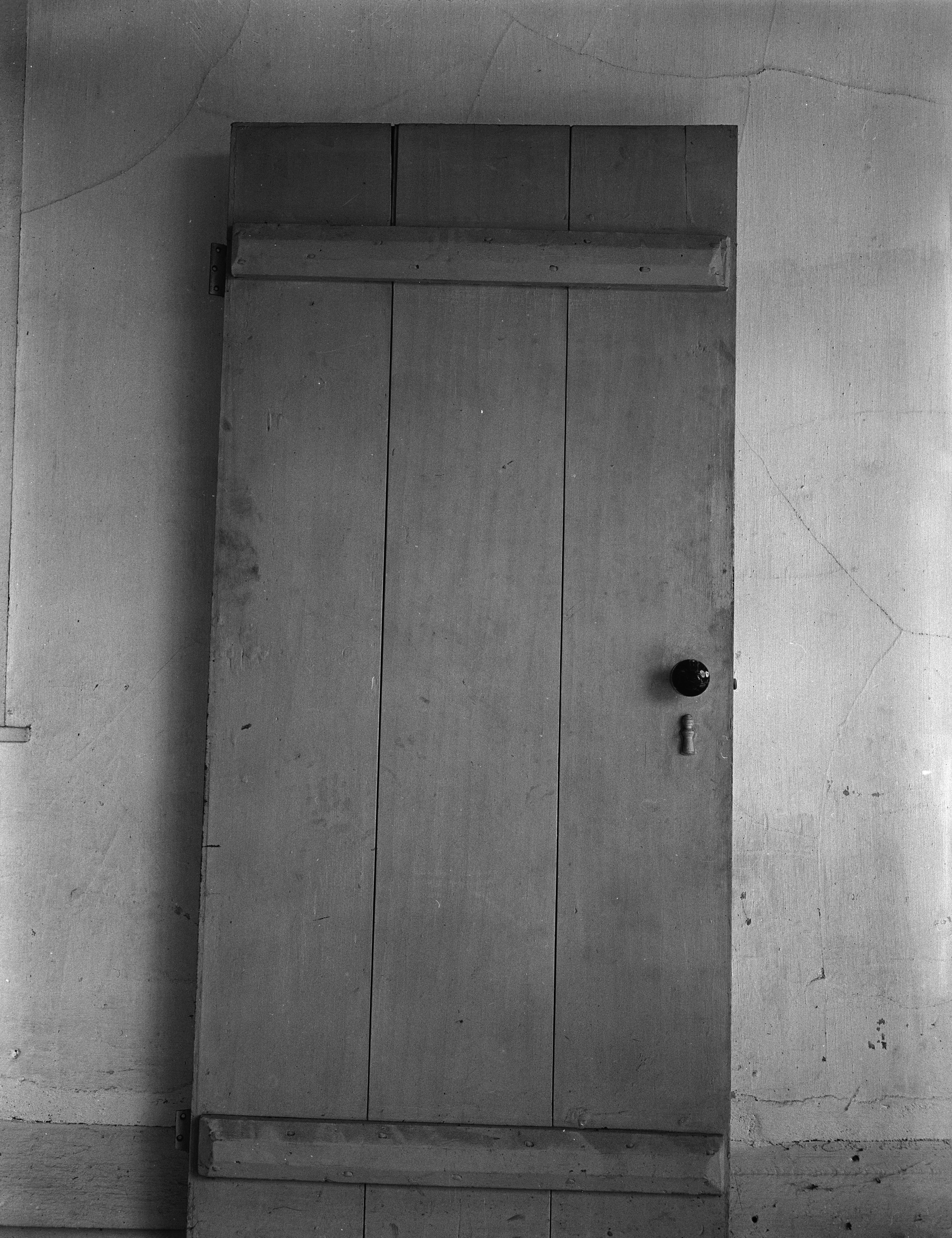

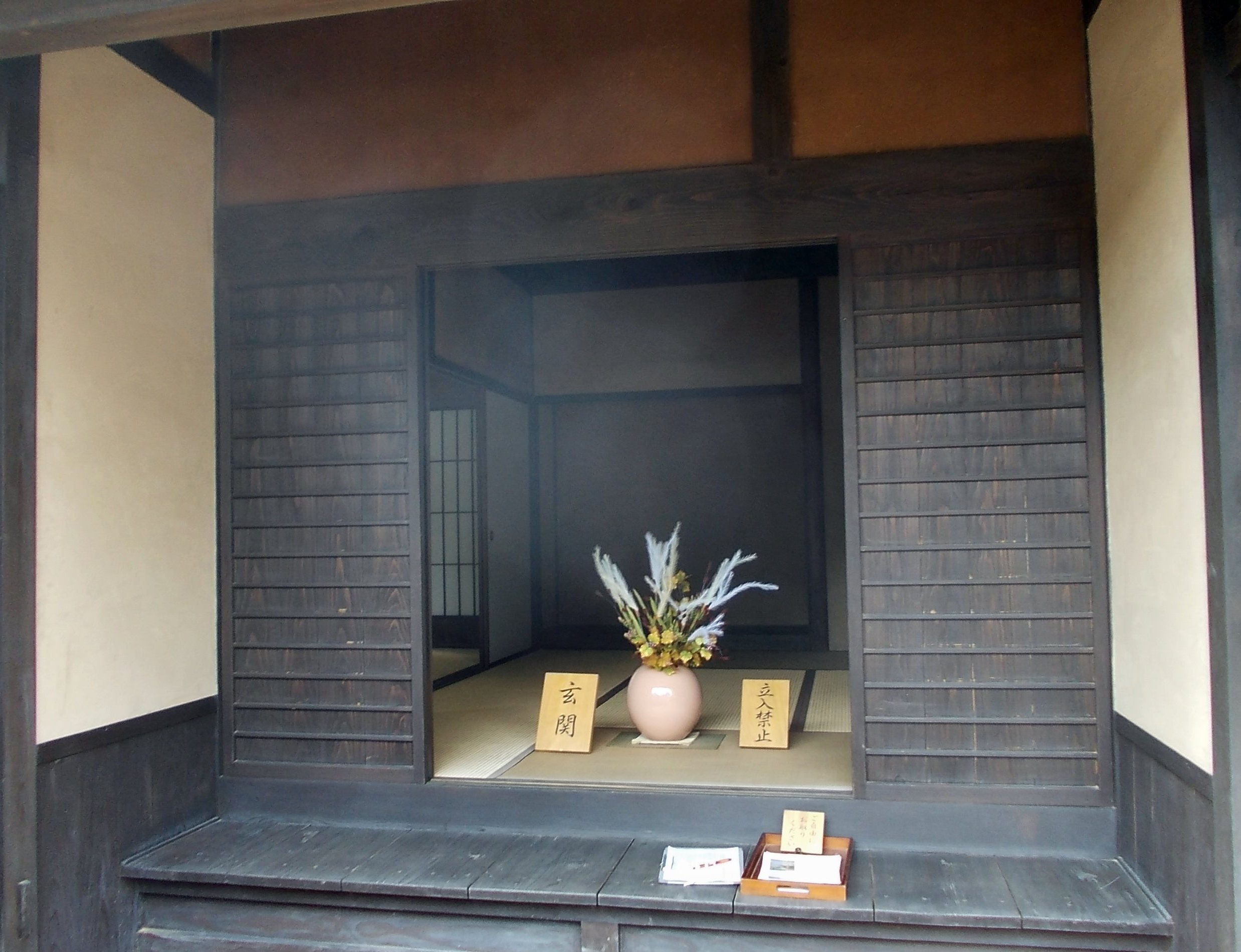
A traditional Japanese maira-do, a batten door

In door construction battens may be used to strengthen panels made up of multiple boards, as in a batten door, or to cover joins.

== Wall insulation ==
Battens are used for solid wall insulation. Regularly spaced battens are fitted to the wall, the spaces between them filled with insulation, and plasterboard or drywall screwed to the battens. This method is no longer the most popular, as rigid insulation sheets give better insulation (with battens bridging the insulation) and take less time to fit.

== Screed batten ==
In concrete work a screed batten is fixed to the formwork to smoothly guide a screed smoothing tool.

== Lighting ==
In the lighting industry, battens refer to linear fittings, commonly LED strips or fluorescent tubes. Batten luminaires are typically cheap and meant to be fixed directly to structural battens in loft spaces or to ceilings and soffits in back-of-house areas where aesthetic value is not required. Fluorescent fittings may include a low-specification diffuser cover, or simply have the fluorescent tube exposed.

== Sailing ==
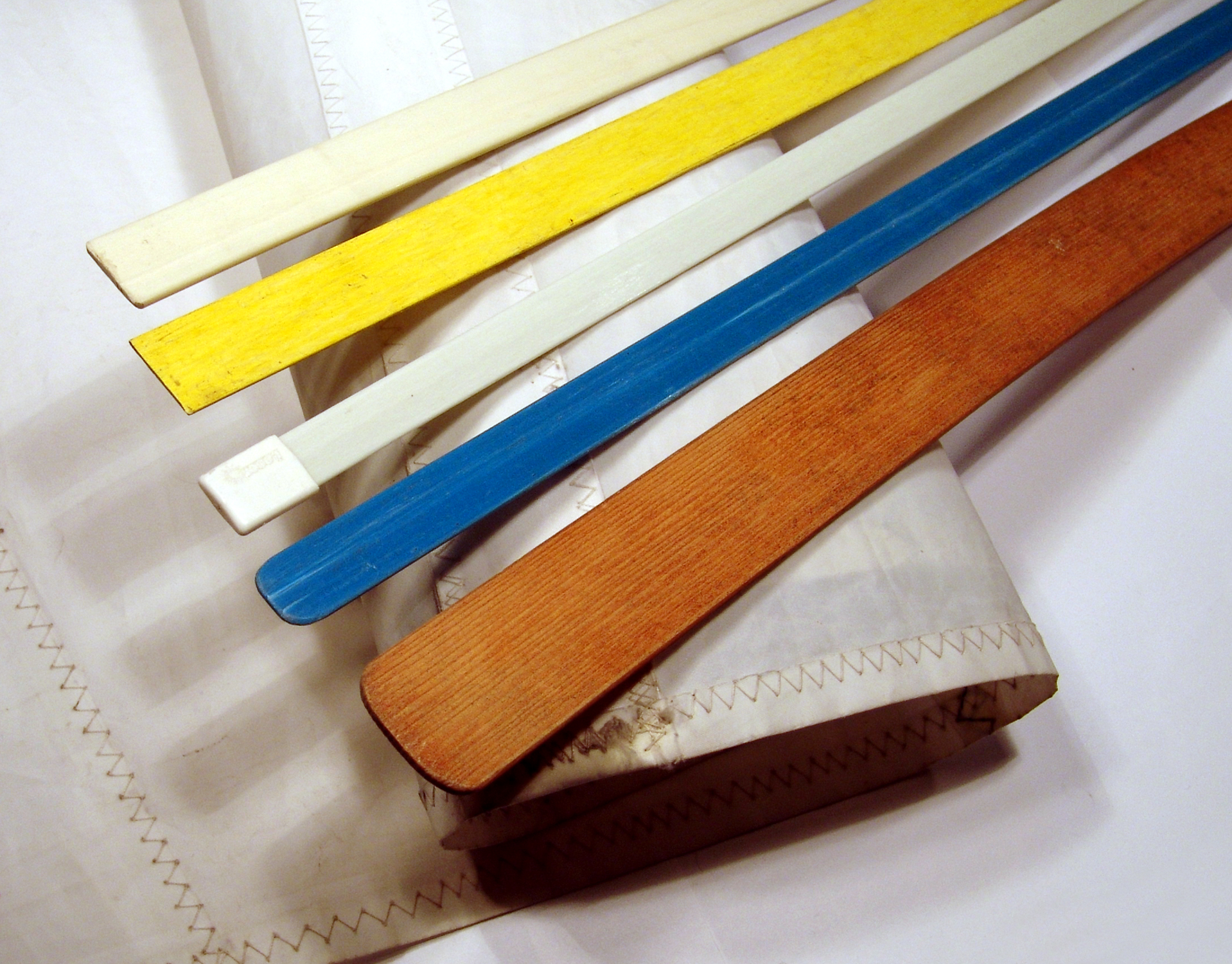
A selection of sail battens

In sailing, battens are long, narrow and flexible inserts used in sails, to improve their qualities as airfoils.
