= Chimney Peak (Olympic Mountains) =

Mountain in Washington (state), United States

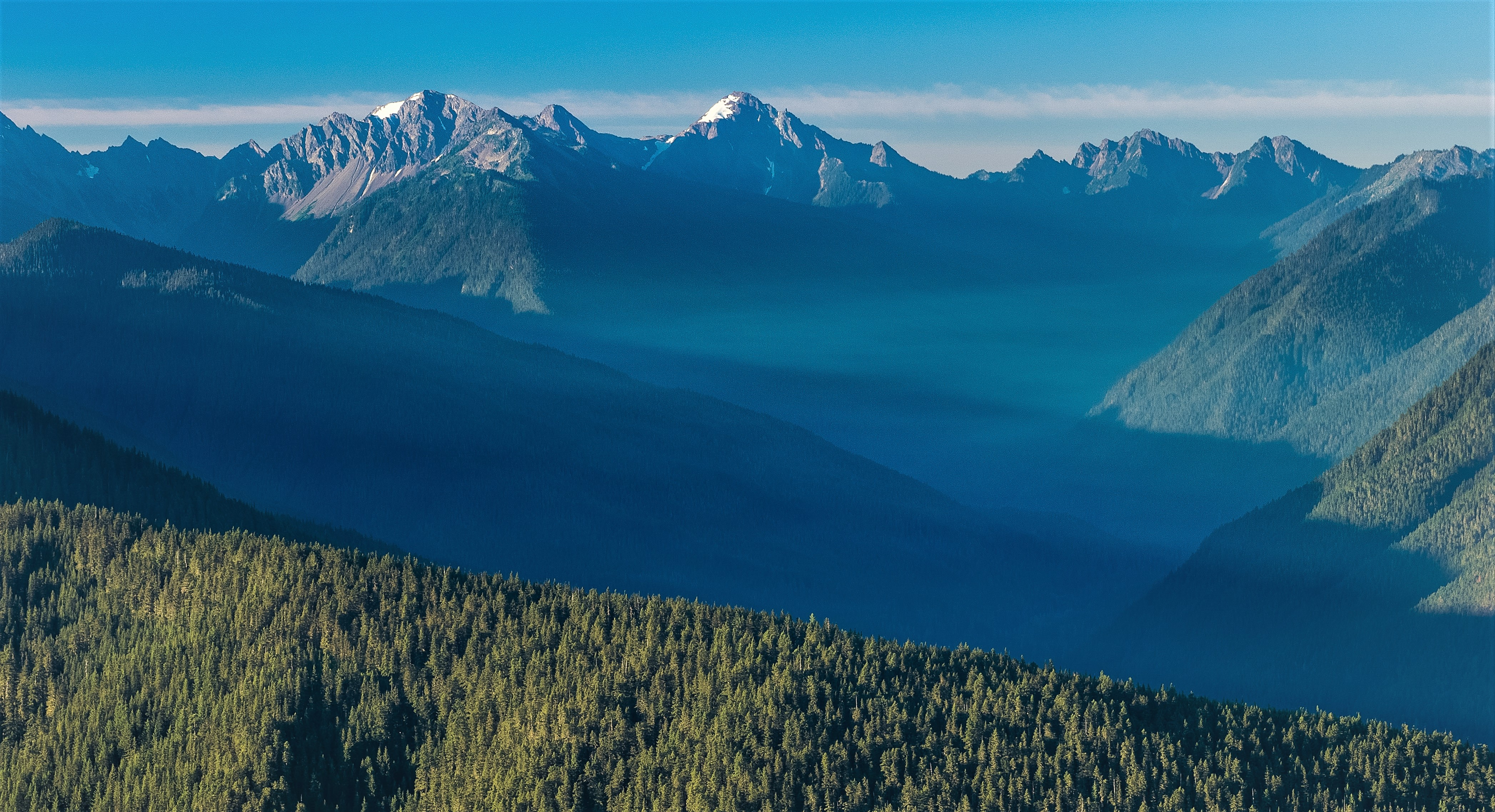
- North aspect of Chimney Peak centered, as viewed from Hurricane Ridge. (Crystal Peak to left)

Highest point
- Elevation: 6,917 ft (2,108 m)
- Prominence: 997 ft (304 m)
- Parent peak: West Peak (7,365 ft)
- Isolation: 3.41 mi (5.49 km)
- Coordinates: 47°41′22″N 123°24′09″W

Geography
- Location within Washington (state) Location within the United States
- Country: United States
- State: Washington
- County: Jefferson
- Protected area: Olympic National Park
- Parent range: Olympic Mountains
- Topo map: USGS Chimney Peak

Geology
- Rock age: Eocene

Climbing
- First ascent: 1941
- Easiest route: class 3 scrambling via SW ridge

Chimney Peak is a 6,917-foot-elevation (2,108-meter) mountain summit located within Olympic National Park in Jefferson County of Washington state. Chimney Peak is situated near the head of Elwha Valley, and immediately north above Enchanted Valley. Topographic relief is significant as the southeast aspect rises 4,800 feet (1,500 meters) above Enchanted Valley in less than one mile. Enchanted Valley is also known as Valley of 10,000 Waterfalls, and numerous waterfalls tumble down the immense cliffs of Chimney Peak. Neighbors include Crystal Peak, 2.2 mi (3.5 km) to the north, White Mountain 3.5 mi (5.6 km) to the east, and West Peak 3.4 mi (5.5 km) to the northeast. Precipitation runoff from the mountain drains north to the Elwha River, and south to the Quinault River.

== History ==
This landform was originally named "Old Snowback" in 1890 by Charles Barnes of the 1889-90 Seattle Press Expedition. The mountain's present, official, descriptive name is attributable to a 100-foot-high chimney-like tower on the peak's west aspect, which is known as "The Chimney". The first ascent of the summit was made in 1941 by Tolvo J. Nelson of the United States Geological Survey. The first ascent of The Chimney was made in 1970 by Mike Banner and Vern Johnson via class 5.3 climbing.

== Climate ==
Based on the Köppen climate classification, Chimney Peak is located in the marine west coast climate zone of western North America. Weather fronts originating in the Pacific Ocean travel northeast toward the Olympic Mountains. As fronts approach, they are forced upward by the peaks (orographic lift), causing them to drop their moisture in the form of rain or snow. As a result, the Olympics experience high precipitation, especially during the winter months in the form of snowfall. Because of maritime influence, snow tends to be wet and heavy, resulting in avalanche danger. During winter months weather is usually cloudy, but due to high pressure systems over the Pacific Ocean that intensify during summer months, there is often little or no cloud cover during the summer. The months June through September offer the most favorable weather for viewing or climbing this peak.

== Geology ==
The Olympic Mountains are composed of obducted clastic wedge material and oceanic crust, primarily Eocene sandstone, turbidite, and basaltic oceanic crust. The mountains were sculpted during the Pleistocene era by erosion and glaciers advancing and retreating multiple times.

== See also ==
- Olympic Mountains
- Geology of the Pacific Northwest

== Gallery ==
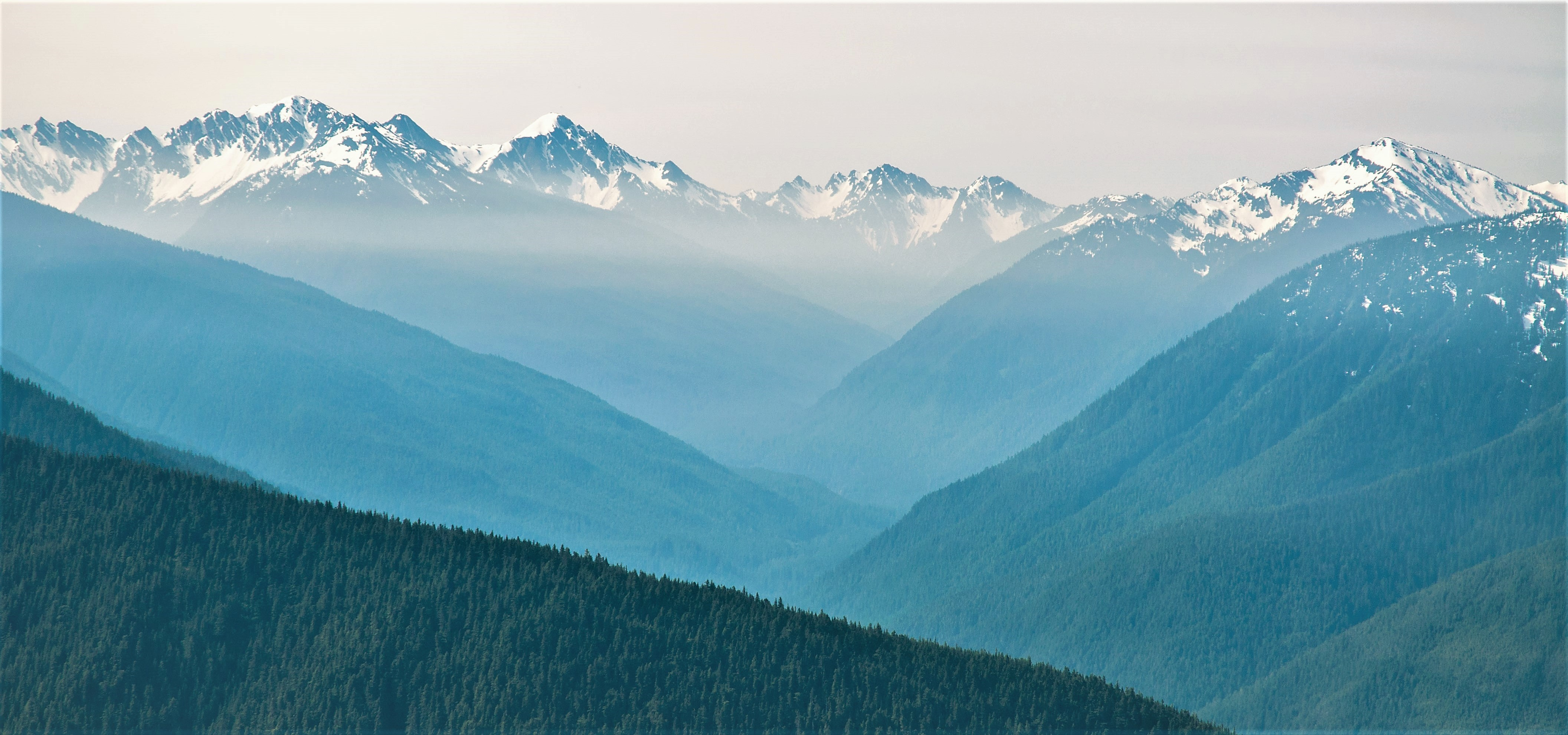
Left to right: Crystal Peak, Chimney Peak, Elwha Valley, Mount Dana.
View from Hurricane Ridge.

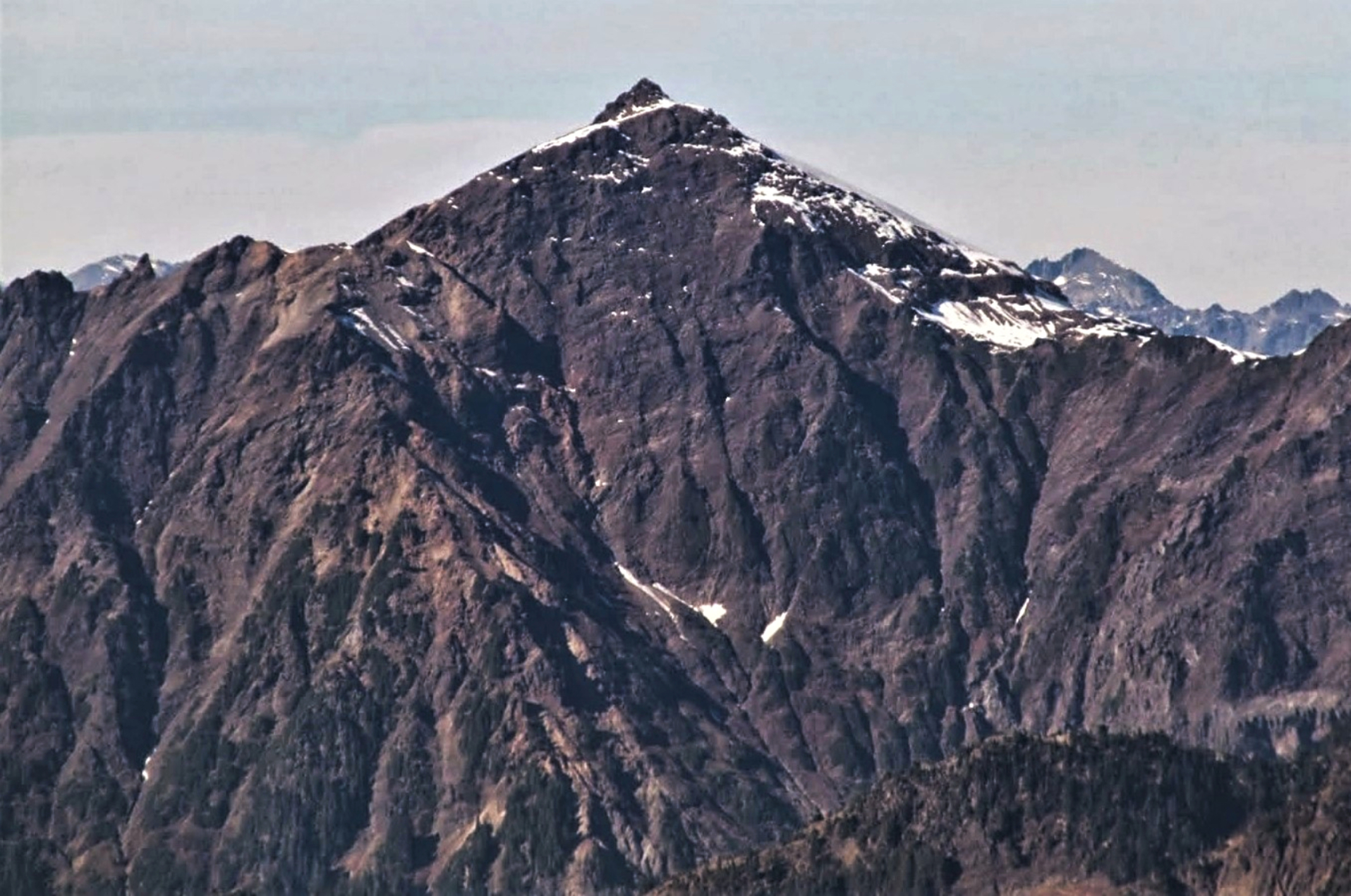
East aspect

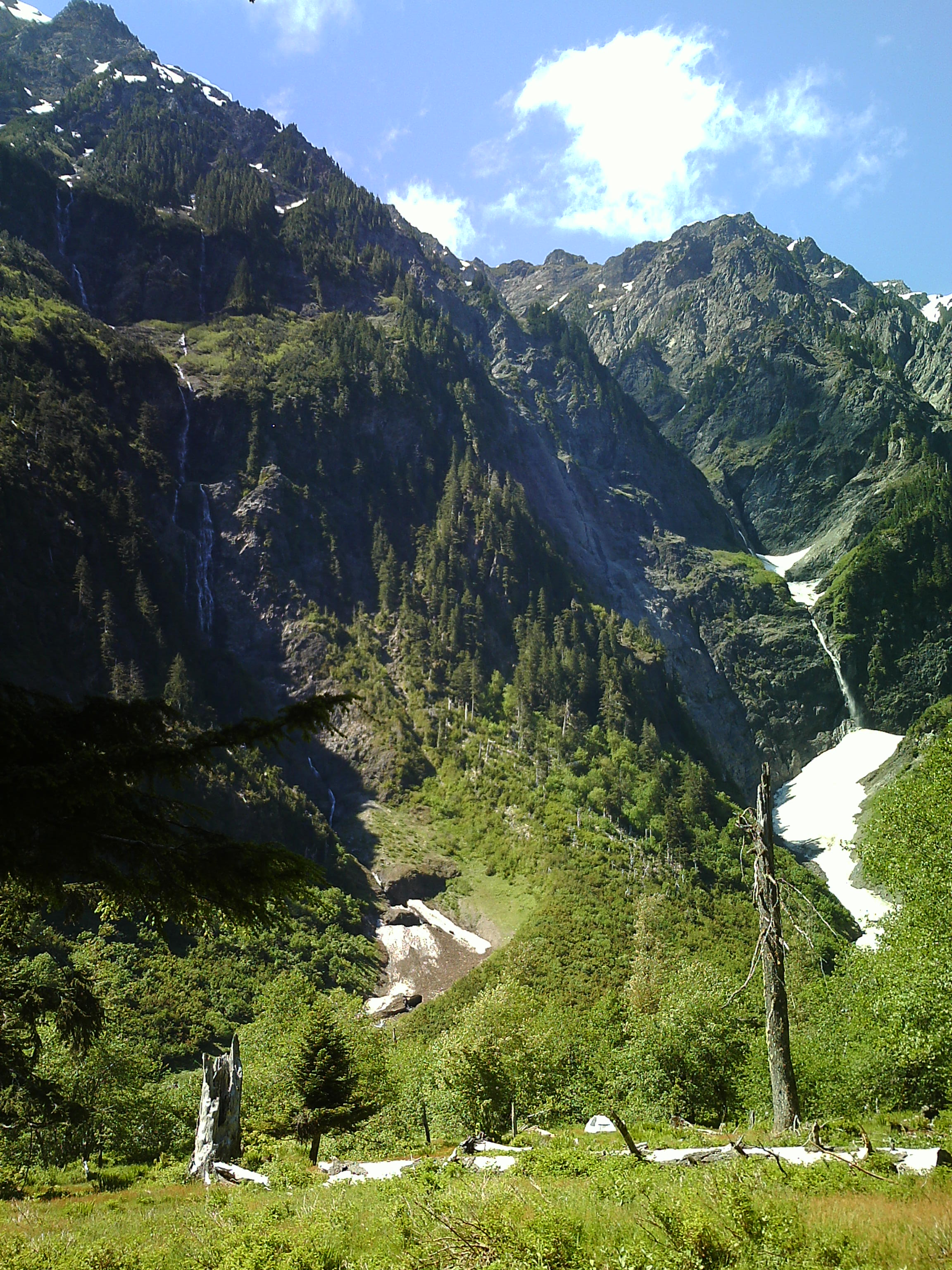
Waterfalls on Chimney Peak's southeast slopes, seen from Enchanted Valley

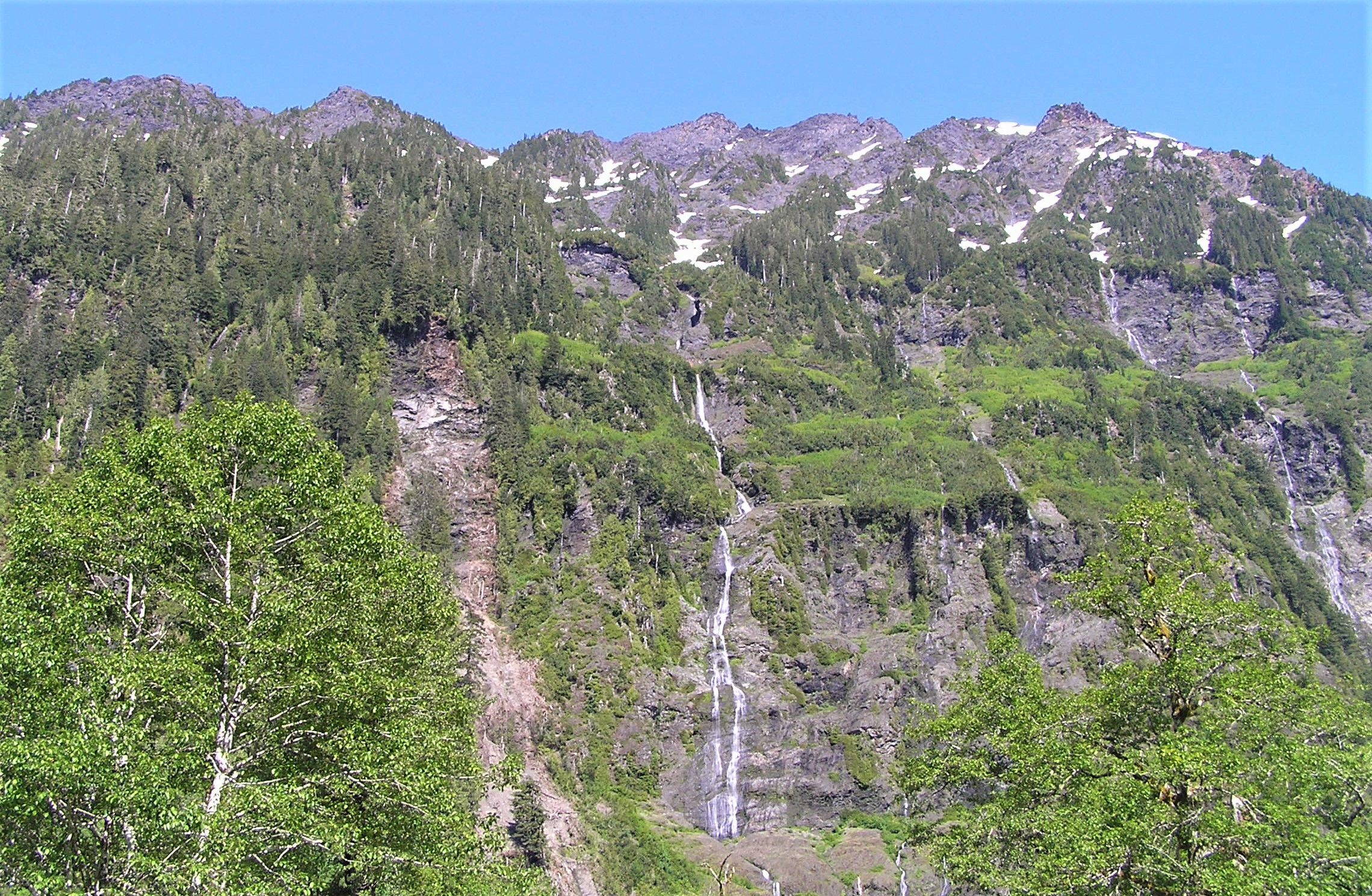
Waterfalls on Chimney Peak's southeast slopes, seen from Enchanted Valley

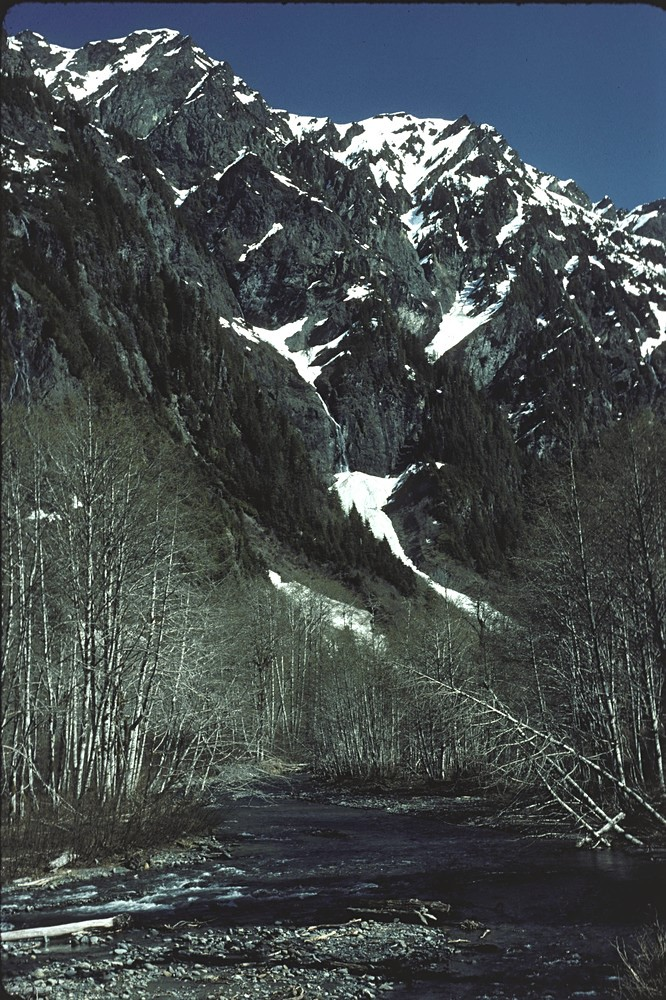
East Fork Quinault River and Chimney Peak in Enchanted Valley

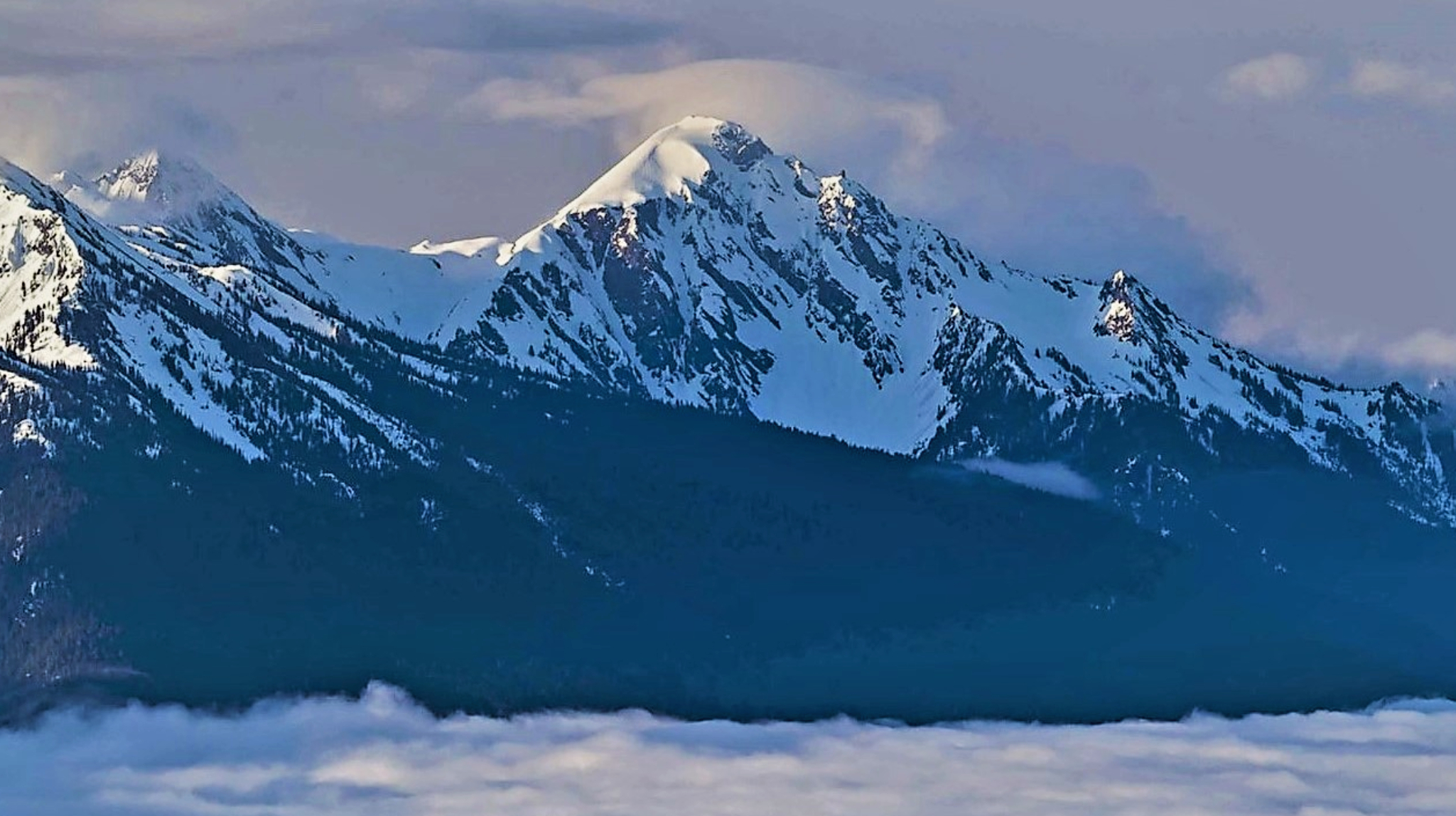
Chimney Peak seen from Hurricane Ridge
