= Marblehead Colonial Raised House =

Coordinates: 42°30′12.00″N 70°50′58.04″W

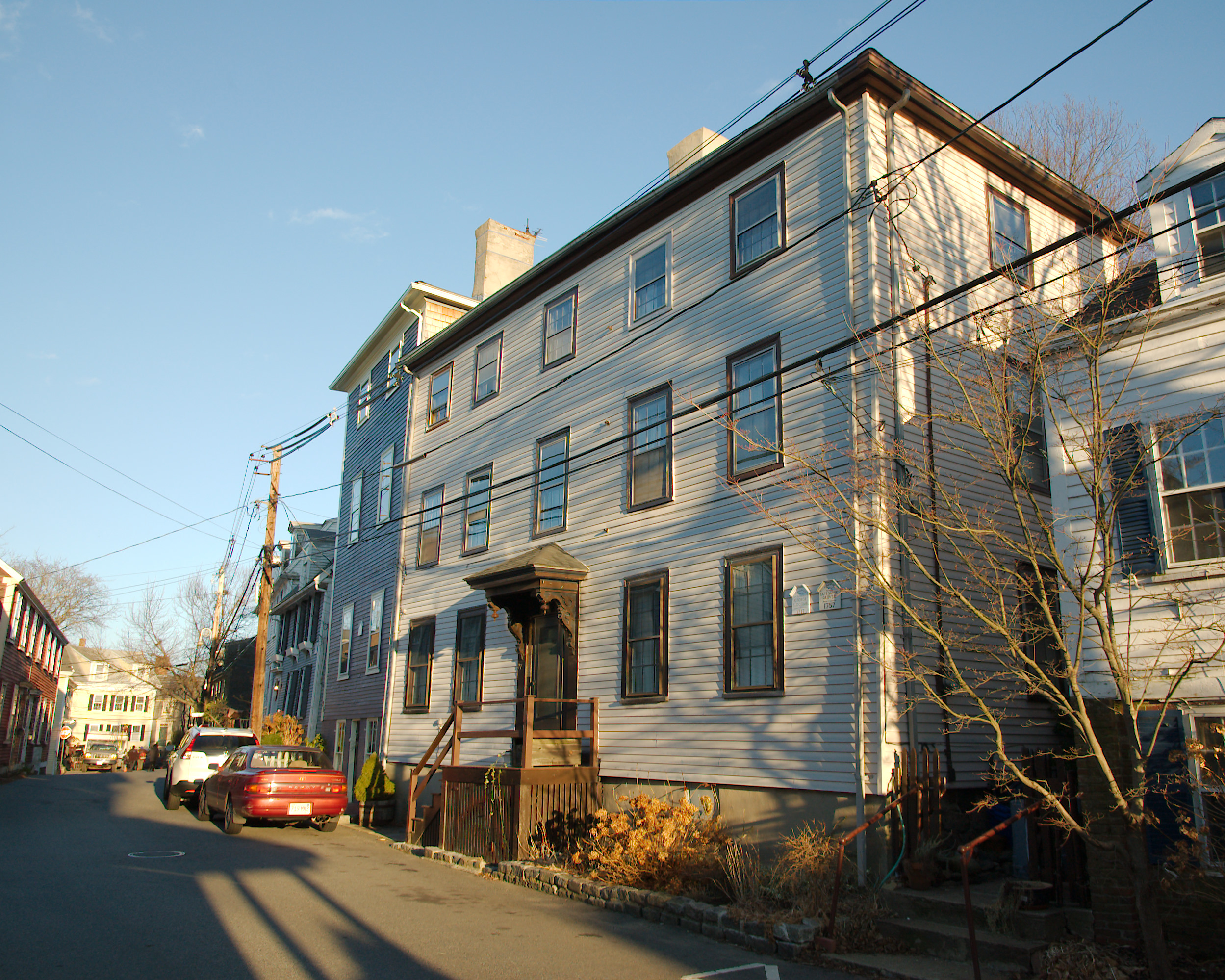
Marblehead Summer House at 27 Front Street

The Marblehead Summer House is a house in Marblehead, Massachusetts, in the United States. There is evidence of it having been constructed as a one-storey building in 1717, and it was later converted to become an early three-storey building.

== History and Ownership ==
It is likely the oldest existing three-story structure in Marblehead, and shows signs that it was raised from one to three stories. It is currently an inn located in the historic district of Marblehead in the old water front area. According to historical research done by Robert Booth, a noted area historian and Harvard graduate, the original structure was built by George Slocumb sometime prior to 1717. No record of the construction itself has been found; however, the building and land was mortgaged October 30, 1717, to John Bowdoin, a merchant in Boston. This is the earliest known documentation of the structure. On March 15, 1720, Slocumb remortgaged to Bowdoin for 164 li (pounds). Slocumb was a “shoreman” (one involved in the curing, salting, drying and storage of fish) and a “joiner” (carpenter) by trade. On June 24, 1728, he sold the house to Bowdoin for 400 li. On September 8, 1756, Bowdoin's heirs sold the premises for 70 li to Capt. Samuel Glover, the brother of John Glover, who later became the famous General John Glover who, with his Marblehead men, ferried George Washington across the Delaware River to attack the Hessians during the revolutionary war. Samuel Glover was also a “cordwainer” (shoemaker), as were a lot of men in Marblehead. He served as a captain in the French and Indian War but was referred to as captain locally due to his position on ship. He was also licensed to sell liquor which was reserved for only those of good standing and reputation. He apparently acquired some degree of wealth between his shoe making, commanding ships, and selling rum. At the time of Glover's death in 1762, “his mansion house, warehouse and land, under and adjoining, situated in Marblehead” was valued at 400 li above his personal possessions. Around 1757 Glover had a three-story house constructed on the property, “his mansion house”, mentioned above. While Booth assumes Slocomb's house was probably dilapidated by then, which it may have been, there is a good deal of physical evidence that the third floor of the current structure was built several years earlier than the first two floors and raised to its current location. Booth makes the following comment in his historical research of the property: “Between making shoes, commanding vessels, and selling Rum, Capt. Glover achieved a fair degree of affluence, and in 1756 he decided to buy the old Slocumb house and land, undoubtedly with the intention of raising a fine new house for himself and his family. Perhaps it was completed in time for the birth of Samuel and Mary’s fifth child, Edmond, in the fall of 1757. At the time it was one of the largest and most modish houses in town, which then had very few three-story homes.”

== Architecture and construction ==
There is evidence that the existing third story of the house was the original one-story structure on the property, built around 1717. Forty years earlier than the existing first and second stories of the house were constructed underneath it as it was lifted (raised) from the ground.

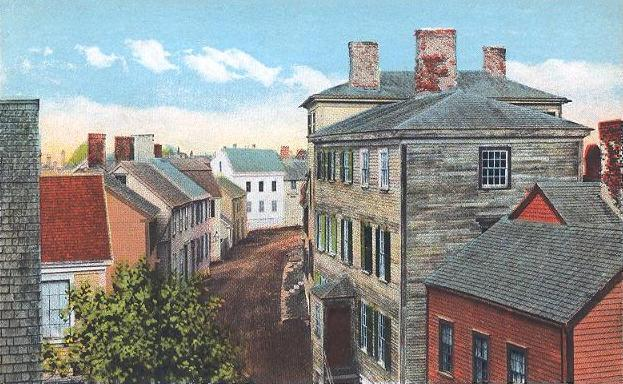
View from a 1914 postcard

Like many other of houses built in the area at the time, the roofs on this colonial post-and-beam was much more complex than modern roofs made with trusses, plywood and asphalt shingles. It was made with a superstructure of large, hand-hewed timbers joined with long wooden spikes, purlins connected to the timbers, boards nailed on top of the purlins, and a covering of hundreds or thousands of handmade wooden shake shingles. This was a lengthy, difficult process which required a great deal of materials. Another reason it was preferable to raise the structure may have been that the posts in the existing structure could not be trusted to bear the weight of a second story built on top of it, especially if two new stories were to be added, as they appear to have been in this case, at what was once known as the “Samuel Glover Mansion”, now the “Marblehead Summer House”, at 27 Front Street, Marblehead, Massachusetts.:
