= Crystal Peak (Olympic Mountains) =

Mountain in Washington (state), United States

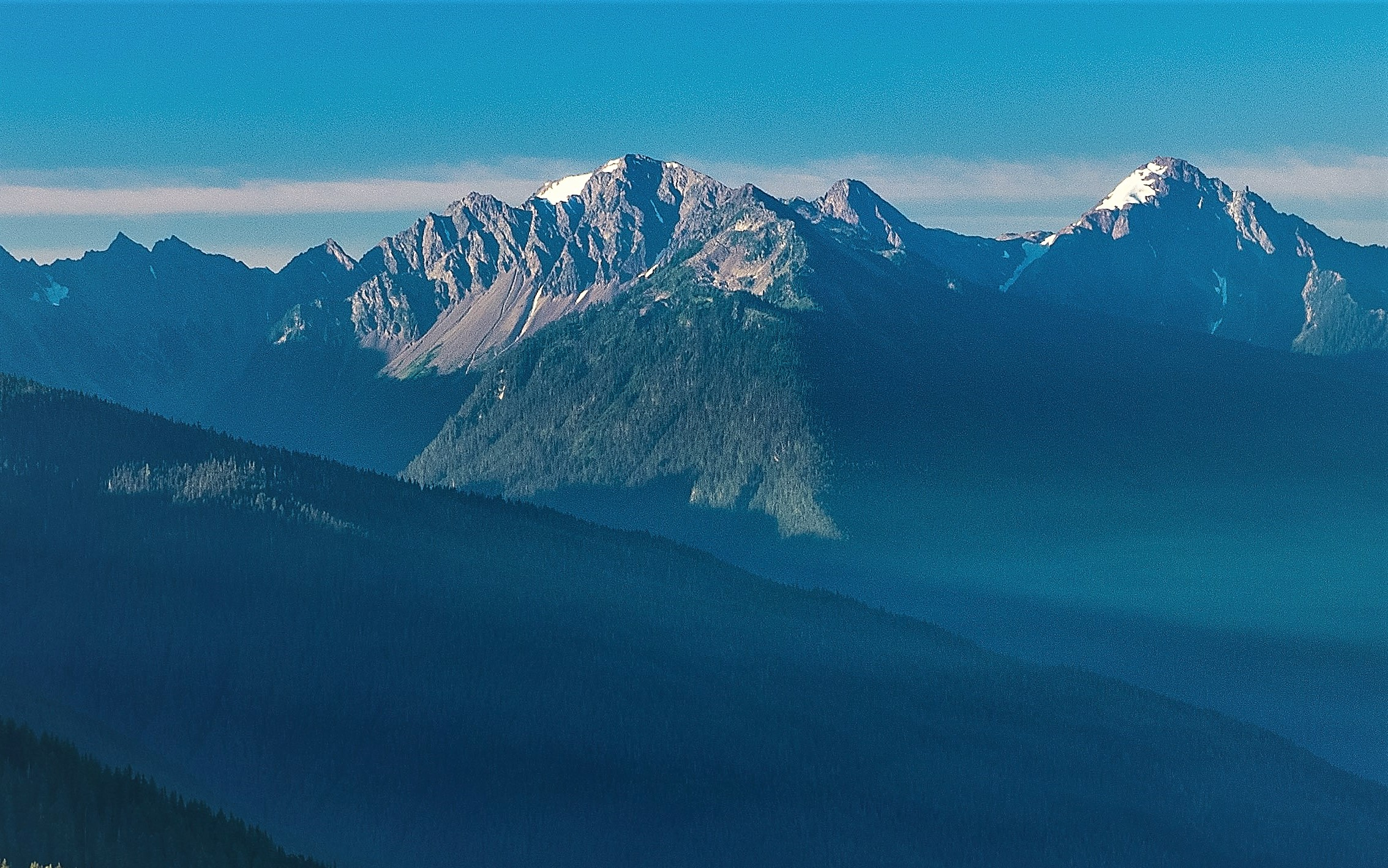
- North aspect of Crystal Peak centered, as viewed from Hurricane Ridge. (Chimney Peak to right)

Highest point
- Elevation: 6,896 ft (2,102 m)
- Prominence: 896 ft (273 m)
- Parent peak: Chimney Peak (6,917 ft)
- Isolation: 1.98 mi (3.19 km)
- Coordinates: 47°43′13″N 123°23′29″W

Geography
- Location within Washington (state) Location within the United States
- Country: United States
- State: Washington
- County: Jefferson
- Protected area: Olympic National Park
- Parent range: Olympic Mountains
- Topo map: USGS Chimney Peak

Geology
- Rock age: Eocene

Climbing
- First ascent: 1976
- Easiest route: class 2 scrambling

Crystal Peak is a 6,896-foot-elevation (2,102-meter) mountain summit located within Olympic National Park in Jefferson County of Washington state. Crystal Peak is situated two miles north of Enchanted Valley, near the heads of Hayes River and Quinault River. Topographic relief is significant as the northeast aspect rises 3,300 feet (1,000 meters) above Hayes River in less than one mile. Precipitation runoff from the mountain drains north to the Elwha River via Hayes River and Godkin Creek. Neighbors include line parent Chimney Peak, 2.2 mi (3.5 km) to the south, and proximate parent West Peak, 2.0 mi (3.2 km) to the east. The lower slopes of the mountain are surrounded by Western Red Cedar, Sitka Spruce, Western Hemlock, Alaskan Cedar, Mountain Hemlock, and Douglas-fir of the Quinault Rainforest.

== History ==
This landform was originally named "Mount McCullough" in 1890 by the 1889-90 Seattle Press Expedition, for J. B. McCullough, the editor of the St. Louis Globe-Democrat. The mountain's present, official, descriptive name is attributable to quartz and silicates found in rocks on the peak's ridges. The first ascent of the summit was made in 1976 by George Bauer, Ron Brown, Bill Foster, Bill Larson, Mike Lonac, Sue Ritter, Roy Teague, and Jim White.

== Climate ==
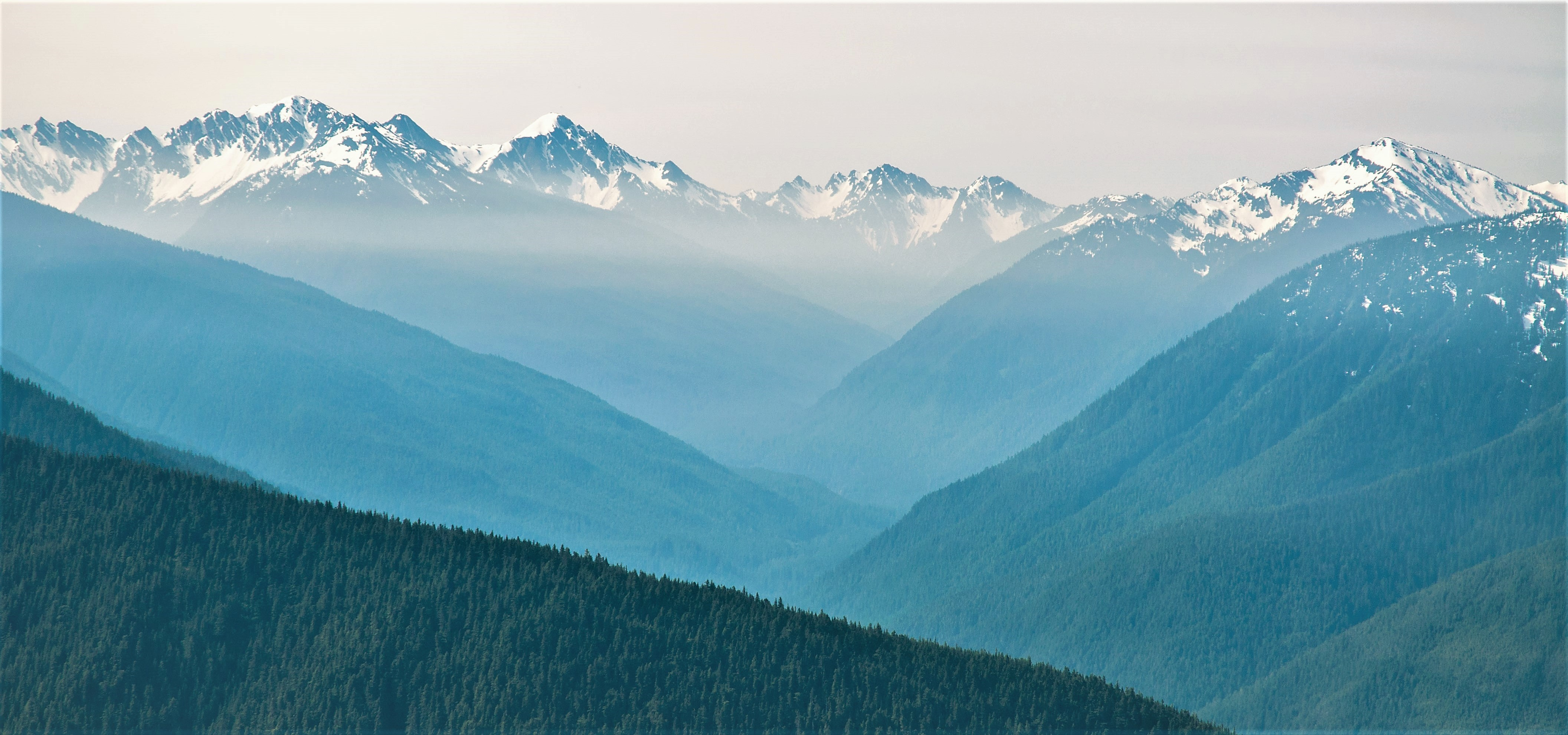
Left to right: Crystal Peak, Chimney Peak, Elwha Valley, Mount Dana. View from Hurricane Ridge.

Based on the Köppen climate classification, Crystal Peak is located in the marine west coast climate zone of western North America. Weather fronts originating in the Pacific Ocean travel northeast toward the Olympic Mountains. As fronts approach, they are forced upward by the peaks (orographic lift), causing them to drop their moisture in the form of rain or snow. As a result, the Olympics experience high precipitation, especially during the winter months in the form of snowfall. Because of maritime influence, snow tends to be wet and heavy, resulting in avalanche danger. During winter months weather is usually cloudy, but due to high pressure systems over the Pacific Ocean that intensify during summer months, there is often little or no cloud cover during the summer. The months June through August offer the most favorable weather for viewing or climbing this peak.

== Geology ==
The Olympic Mountains are composed of obducted clastic wedge material and oceanic crust, primarily Eocene sandstone, turbidite, and basaltic oceanic crust. The mountains were sculpted during the Pleistocene era by erosion and glaciers advancing and retreating multiple times.

== See also ==
- Olympic Mountains
- Geology of the Pacific Northwest
