= Girt =

Horizontal structural member in a framed wall

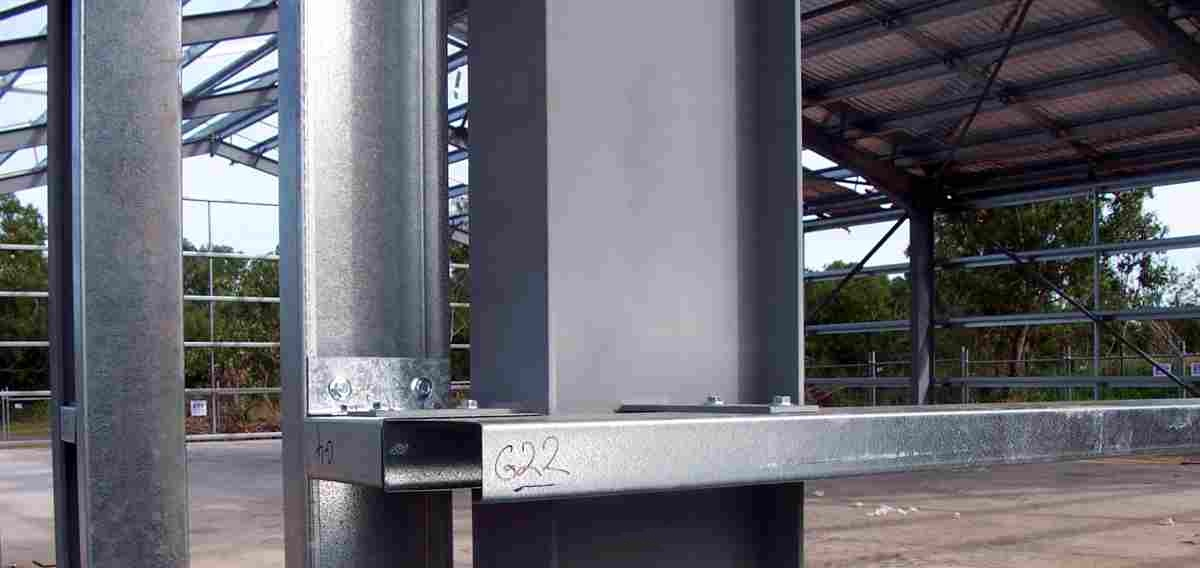
Channel or C section girts bolted to plate cleats welded to a portal column in an industrial building.

In architecture or structural engineering, a girt, also known as a sheeting rail, is a horizontal structural member in a framed wall. Girts provide lateral support to the wall panel, primarily to resist wind loads, and provide a framework for the thermal control layer. Though girts come in a variety of profile shapes, Z-girts predominate wall assembly applications.

A comparable element in roof construction is a purlin.

== Stability in steel building construction ==
The girt is commonly used as a stabilizing element to a building's primary vertical members. Wall cladding fastened to the girt, or a discrete bracing system which includes the girt, can provide shear resistance, in the plane of the wall, along the length of the primary member. Since the girts are normally fastened to, or near, the exterior flange of a column, stability braces may be installed at a girt to resist rotation of the unsupported, inner flange of the primary member. The girt system must be competent and adequately stiff to provide the required stabilizing resistance in addition to its role as a wall panel support.

Girts can be stabilized by sag rods, angles, or straps as well as by the wall cladding itself. Stabilizing rods are discrete brace members to prevent rotation of an unsupported flange of the girt. Sheet metal wall panels are usually considered providing lateral bracing to the connected, typically exterior flange along the length of the girt. Under restricted circumstances, sheet metal wall panels are also capable of providing rotational restraint to the girt section.

== See also ==
- The dictionary definition of girt at Wiktionary
- Girder
