= Board roof =

Type of roof

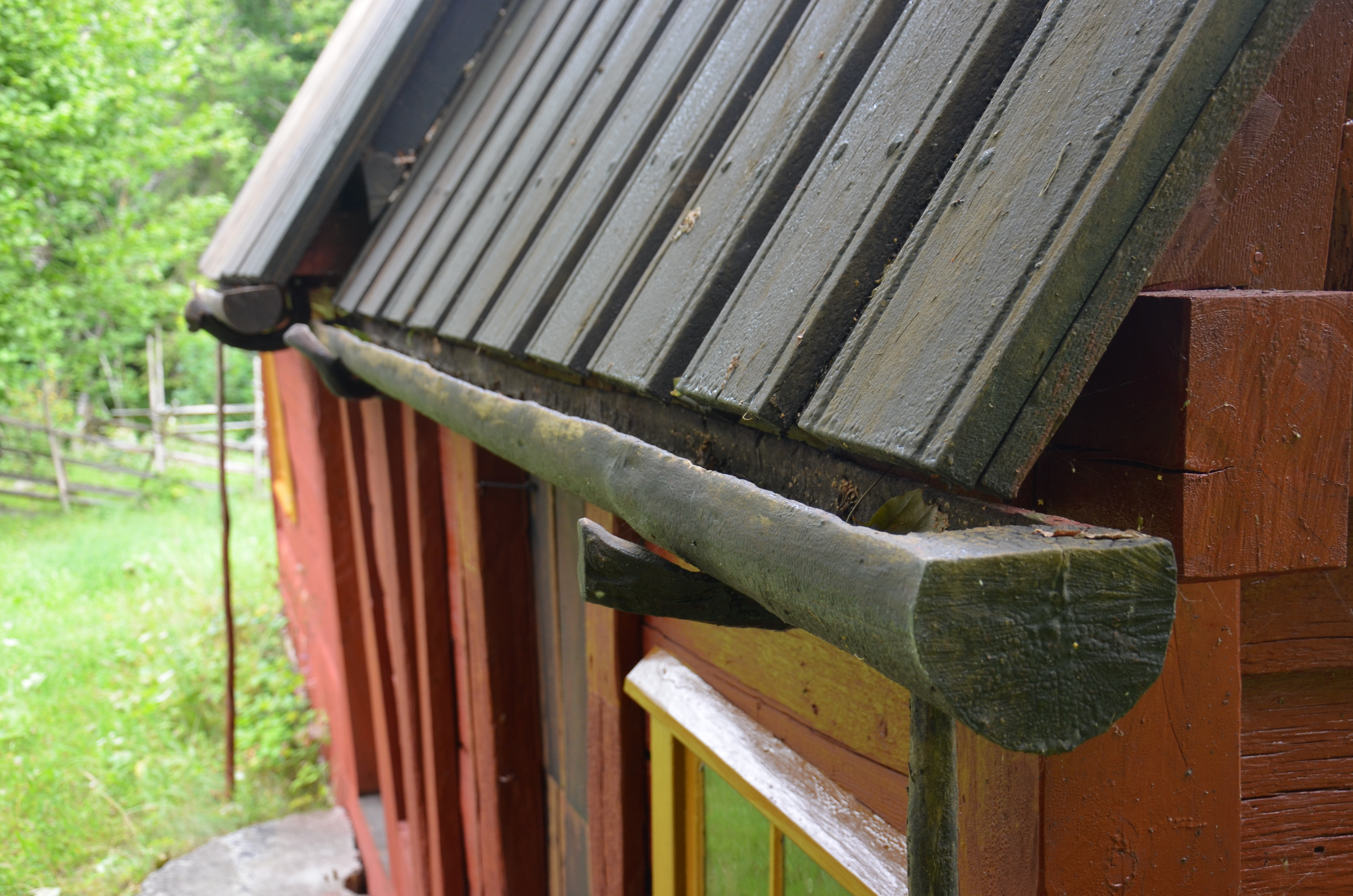
A board roof of the board-on-board type with grooved edges in Sweden

A board roof or boarded roof is a roofing method of using boards as the weather barrier on a roof. Board roofs can be applied in several ways, the basic types have the boards installed vertically and installed horizontally. Double board roofs were sometimes used on railroad cars.

== Vertical board roofs ==
Vertical board roofs may have the boards installed in a number of ways. The board-on-board roof has two layers of vertical boards, the upper layer covering the gap between the boards in the lower layer. The lower layer may be spaced apart or installed tightly together. In any type of vertical board roof the boards may be grooved to catch runoff.

The board-and-batten roof the upper layer are slender pieces of lumber called battens. The lower layer of boards are installed tightly because the battens are narrow.

Traditional roof coverings in Japan are mostly thatch, tile and wood shingle but some board roofs were used and are called yamatobuki (大和葺), the boards themselves naga-itabuki (長板葺).

The framing for a vertically boarded roof needs purlins spaced evenly apart instead of rafters. In parts on New England a common type of roof framing has common purlins which are boarded vertically, but evidence of these roofs having exposed boards as roofing is rare.

Animal shelters may have board roofs which are a single layer with small gaps between the boards to allow light and ventilation. Any leakage is minimal and does not bother the animals.

== Horizontal board roofs ==
Horizontal board roofs may be made with rectangular boards or wedge shaped boards called clapboard (architecture).

== Gallery of types ==
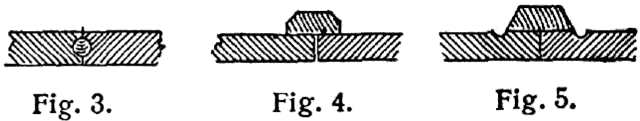
Vertical board roofs with sealed joints and board-and-batten roof types

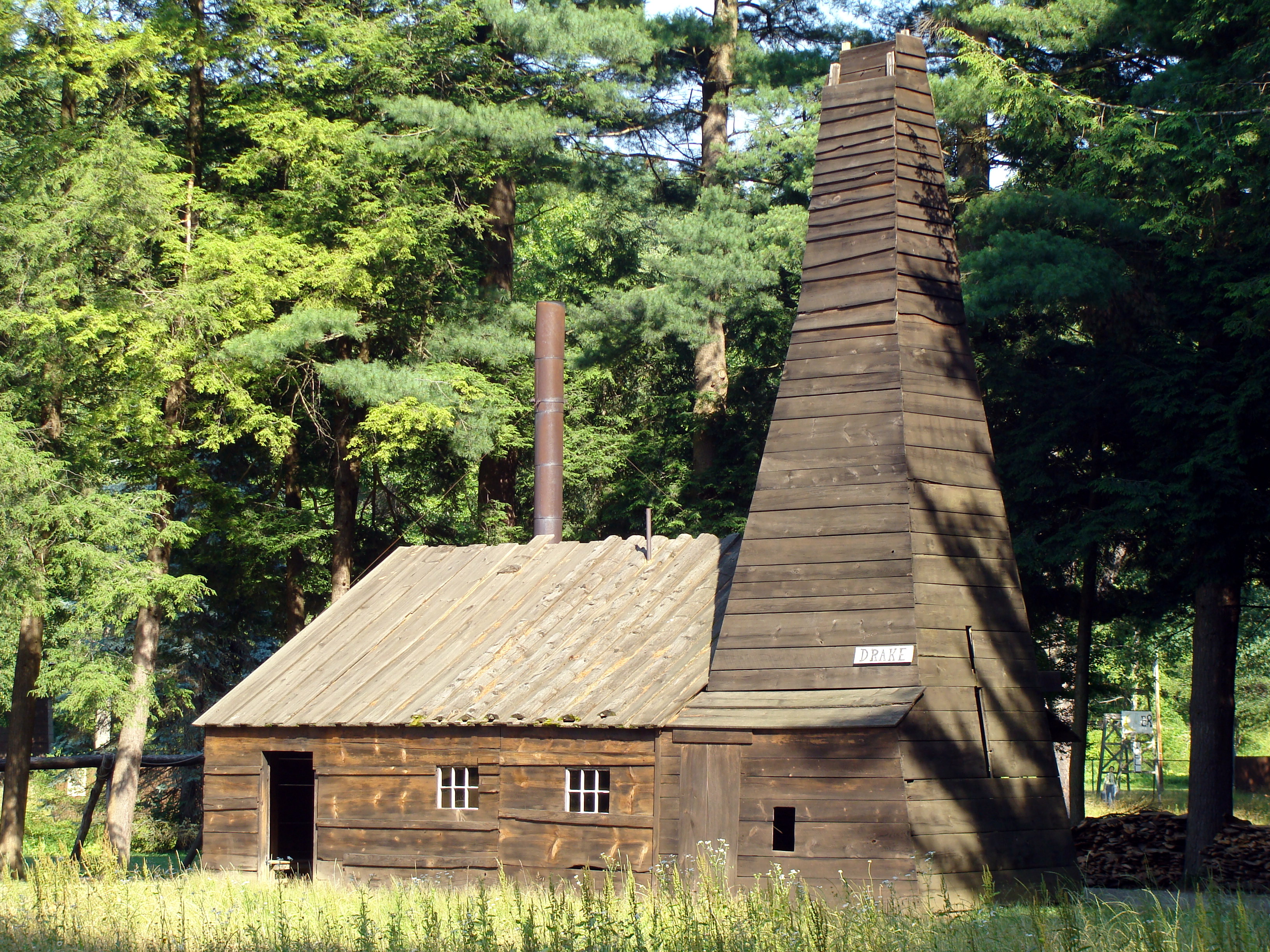
A reconstruction of the Drake Well has two shapes of board-on-board roofing and a horizontal board roof on the tower.

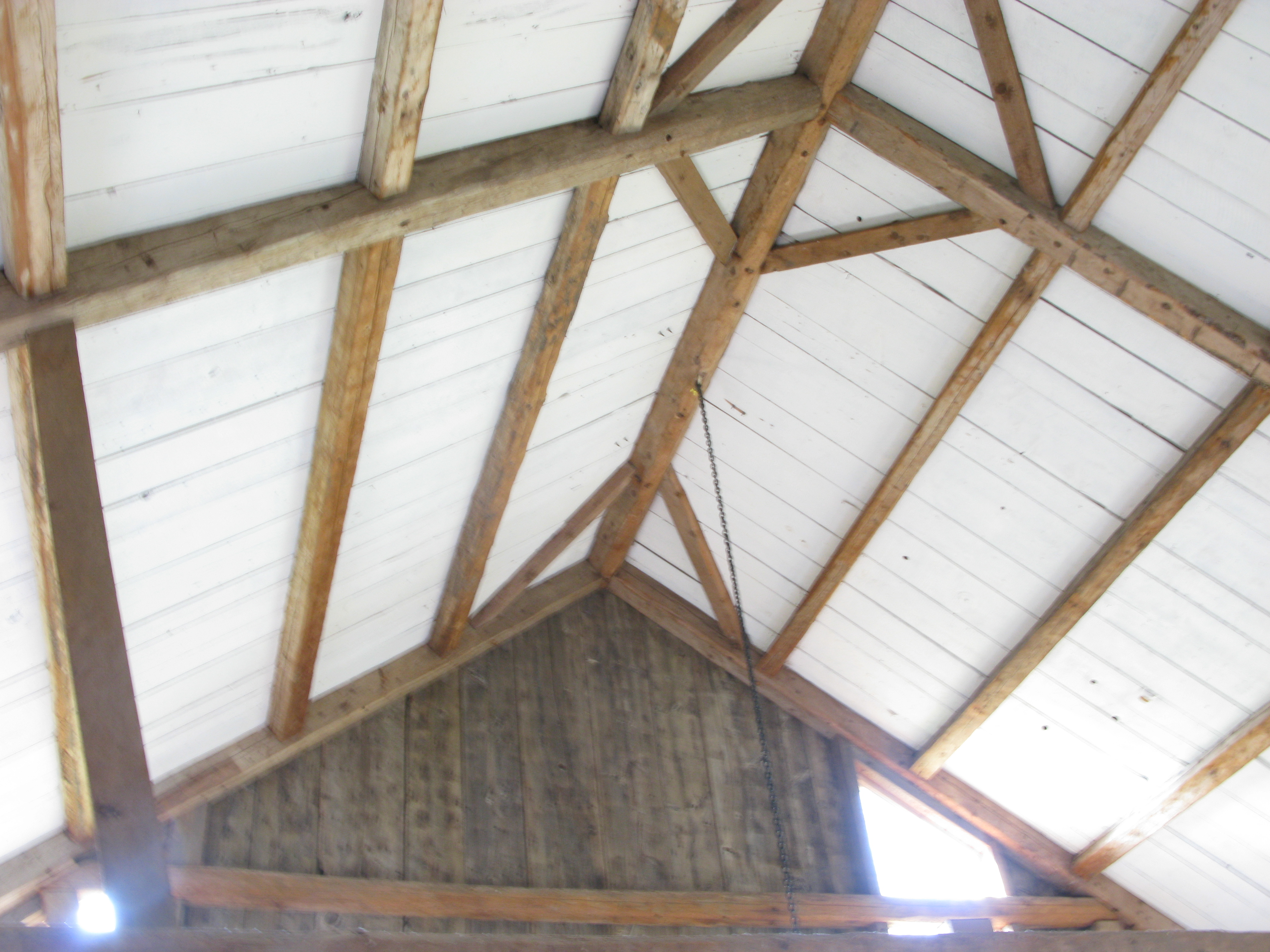
Common purlin framing with vertical boards in New England. This method of framing may be descended from board roofs but does not mean the roofing was originally just the boards.

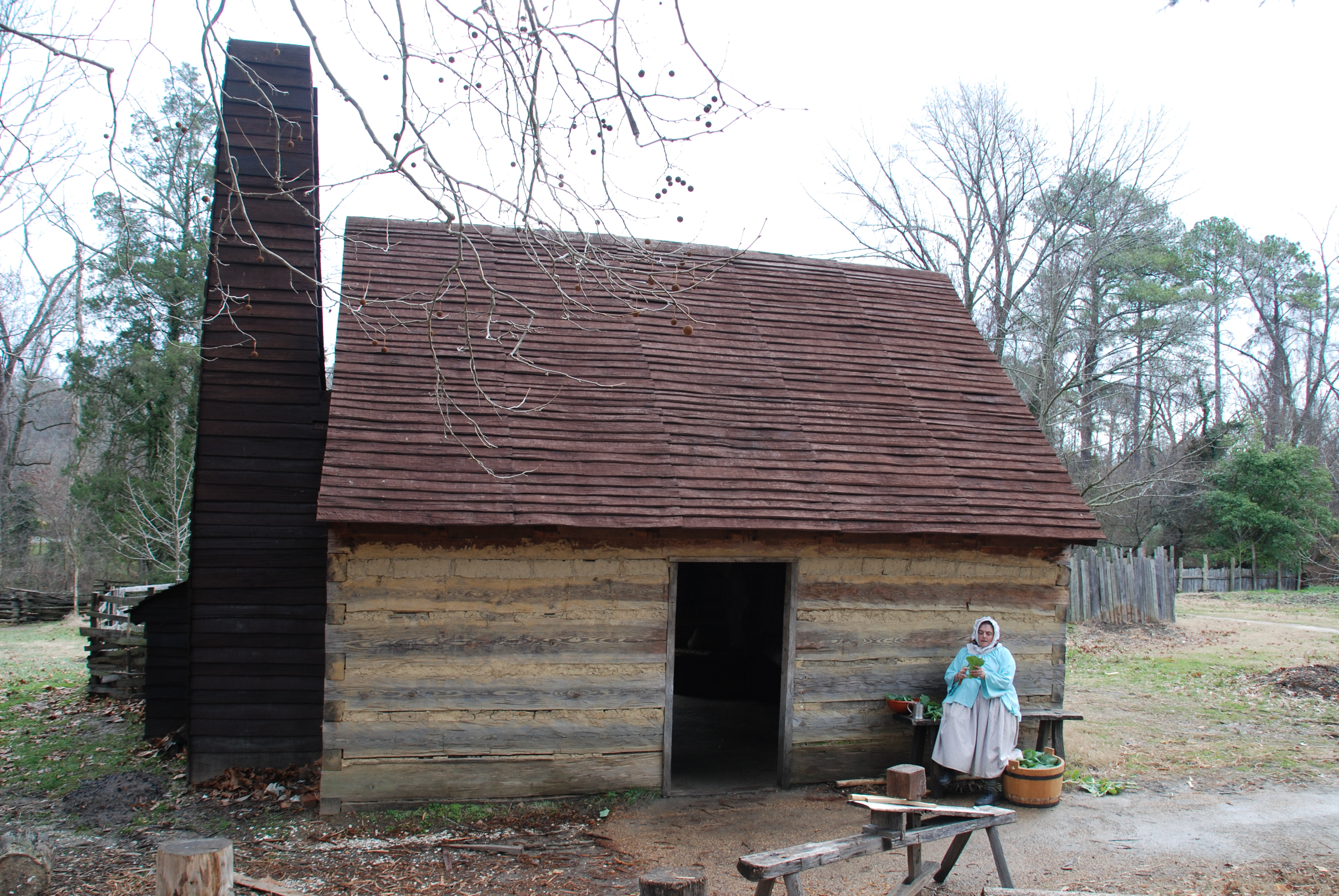
Reconstruction of a log cabin with a clapboard roof.
