= Owain Glyndwr Hotel =

Hotel and restaurant in Corwen, Wales

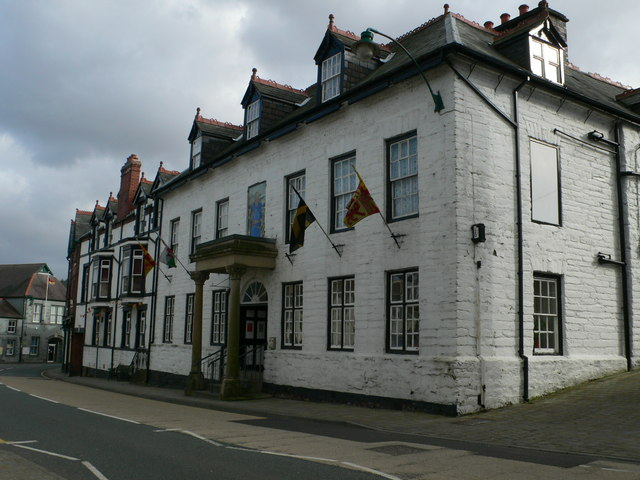

- Location in Denbighshire

General information
- Location: The Square, Corwen, Denbighshire, Wales
- Coordinates: 52°58′50″N 3°22′23″W

Other information
- Number of rooms: 13

The Owain Glyndwr Hotel is a Grade II-listed inn in Corwen, Denbighshire, Wales, and is named after the Welsh national hero Owain Glyndŵr.

The hotel was built in the mid-eighteenth century, but incorporates elements of an earlier structure on the site. It is reportedly the location where the first public Welsh Eisteddfod was held in the late eighteenth century.

== History ==
The original building dated to at least 1329 and was originally a monastery in the grounds of the nearby church. It was rebuilt or replaced circa 1740, but retained elements of the earlier building, and the current structure largely dates from this time. There are older sections of behind the frontage which was known as the New Inn in the 18th century. The hotel building was enlarged with an extra wing and re-roofed about 1890.

The local trade was boosted when the route from London to Holyhead was rebuilt by Thomas Telford in the late 18th century. It was supposedly the site of the first public Welsh Eisteddfod in 1789.

The inn is said to be haunted by the ghost of a young woman who had an affair with a local clergyman which outraged the locals.

During 1854, George Borrow a travel writer visited the Inn for a lunchtimes drink and wrote it was “very appropriately called the Owen Glendower”, considering its location in Owain Glyndŵr's former domain.

== Description ==
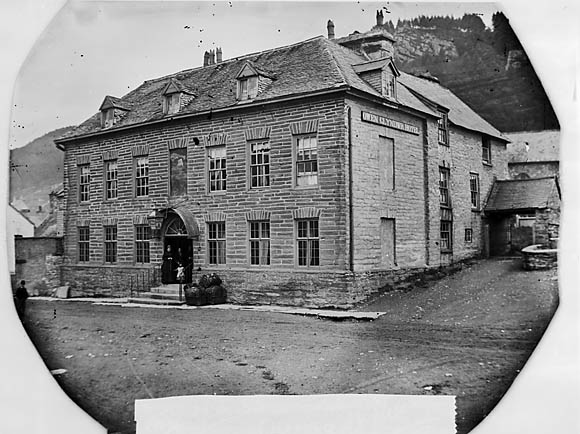
The Owain Glyndŵr Hotel c. 1875, photographed by John Thomas

The hotel is of Italianate architecture, and integrates original features in the 19th century rebuild. The exterior walls of the two-storey main building are painted, coursed and square stone. The hipped slate roof has three gabled dormers and red-tiled decorative cresting with finials. The later wing has a similar roof, albeit with two paired sets of dormers on either side of the front wall stack, although the walls are roughcast rendered with smooth rendered dressings enriched with some terracotta. Two doors with radial fanlights lead inside from the central Corinithian portico porch. An eighteenth-century staircase and several six-panelled interior doors have survived. Substantial ceiling timbers remain at the rear of the main building as do other features that related to the earlier building.
