= Siôn Cent =

Welsh poet (c.1400)

Siôn Cent (c. 1400 – 1430/45), (or 1367? – 1430?) was a Welsh language poet, and is an important figure in Medieval Welsh literature.

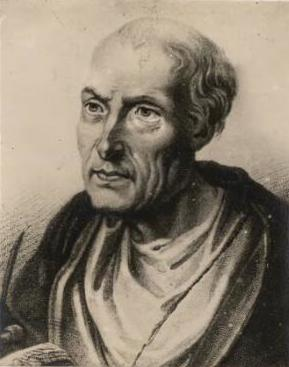

== Similarity to other persons ==
He has also been called Sion Gwent by Gruffydd Robert and Sion Y Kent and Sion Kemp(t), Jacky Kent and Jack of Kent by others.

The reason(s) for the confusion regarding the name may stem from other similarly named, educated or religious people of the era, and additionally, that he is often mistakenly referred to as a Doctor in some surviving manuscripts. Other figures that add to the confusion are figures such as Dr. John Kent, of Caerleon, who was educated at Cambridge University at the end of the 15th century and famous for his wide-ranging educational accomplishments, or Dr. John Gwent, an erudite friar, buried at Hereford in 1348, a bishop John Kemp, later an Archbishop of York in 1426 and Canterbury in 1452, and a cardinal, who died in 1454, and John a Kent, a raider of the Welsh Marches in 1482/3, whose mischievous exploits were recorded by Anthony Munday in the late 16th century in Munday's 'John A Kent and John A Cumber'.

== Placing him in time and space ==
From his surviving cywyddau it can reasonably be deduced that he wrote between 1400 and 1430. He is traditionally associated with Brecknockshire, and wrote a eulogy of Brecknock which reveals that he was well acquainted with the area and it held a place in his affections. He is also associated with the Archenfield area of west Herefordshire and the Ewias or Vale of Ewyas of eastern Monmouthshire.

He is believed to have died at Kentchurch Court in the River Monnow valley, but this may be a false tradition.

An oil painting, a portrait, hanging at Kentchurch Court and said to be dated to c.1400 by the National Gallery, is said to depict Siôn Cent. The portrait shows a man in late middle age, wearing monkish robes, holding an open book in his left hand and what is possibly a writing implement in the other. Behind him is a view towards a distant ruined castle on a hill and a fortified house approached via a bridge in the middle distance. A tall thin sapling grows in the garden between in the near middle distance.

The picture is said to have been painted by Jan van Eyck (1385–1441), the Flemish master portrait artist. The portrait has been shown on the cover of Alex Gibbon's book The Mystery of Jack of Kent & the Fate of Owain Glyndŵr.

It has been said to depict Sir John Oldcastle, Sir John Scudamore, Owain Glyndŵr or Siôn Cent.

Siôn Cent is said to have been a chaplain to the Scudamore family, secretary to Sir John Scudamore, tutor to his children, later joining a Franciscan order abroad and returning again several years later as chaplain once more. He was said to be highly educated, fluent in Welsh, Latin and English and he is also said to have translated the Bible into Welsh.

== His verse ==
Siôn is most famous for using his poetry in the service of his Christian beliefs and standing outside the tradition of praise of Patron which was so important in Welsh poetry. He uses the cywydd meter for his work, but in order to attack the sins of this world. His pessimistic outlook is understandable in view of the mortality of the Black Death, wars abroad and at home and the Owain Glyndŵr rebellion which was in full flow in Wales during his lifetime.

His cywyddau have one unique feature that marks them out - they are divided into stanzas, the last line of each being the same, and acting as the 'burden' of the poem.

It has been said of him that his best and possibly the most accurately attributable of his work concerns the uncertainties of life, all that pertains to that and the inevitability of death and the Last Judgement. He described the world as he saw it, pessimistically, though with some optimism when regarding the possibility of an eternity in heaven.

In the 1420s he attacked the work of the bard Rhys Goch Eryri, suggesting that his praise of worldly values were lies prompted by the Devil.

Perhaps his most famous poem is "I wagedd ac oferedd y byd" ("In praise of the vanity and wantonness of the world"). He turns his back on the praise of nobles, which he sees as flattery and falsehood, and sets his eyes on the blessedness of heaven. Siôn Kent's verse became very popular and he started a vogue for more religious Welsh poetry.

In later tradition he was connected to the Marches folklore figure John of Kent or Jack of Kent but this figure is likely to be a combination of several people rather than just him.

== See also ==
- Jack o' Kent
- Medieval Welsh literature
- Owain Glyndŵr
