= Jack o' Kent =

English folkloric character in the Welsh Marches

Jack o' Kent or Jack-a-Kent is an English and Welsh folkloric character based in the Welsh Marches. He is alternately referred to as either a cleric or wizard who regularly beats the Devil in bets and games. He is most well known around Herefordshire and Monmouthshire, and his legends are used to tell the origin of many of the geological formations around the region.

== History ==
Jack o' Kent appears in print for the first time in a sixteenth-century play, so it may be assumed that he was well known in local culture before this time. He is said to have been used as a bogeyman figure until at least the early twentieth century.

There is speculation that Jack could be Siôn Cent, and other suggestions are that he was Owain Glyndŵr, but it is more likely that he was an amalgamation of a number of people and myths.

== Legends ==
Jack often outsmarted the Devil by entering into bargains and then fulfilling the letter of the bargain but not the spirit. In one instance he made a deal with the Devil so that his crops would prosper - Jack would plant the crops, and the devil would make sure that the sun and rain came in proper amounts. Jack asked the Devil which part of the crops he wanted, the "tops" or the "butts" (bottoms), and the Devil picked "tops" thinking that come harvest he would receive a lot of wheat, but Jack planted turnips and left the Devil with the useless leaves. The next year the Devil thought he would get the better of Jack and picked "butts", so Jack planted wheat, and once again the Devil was cheated.

In another story, Jack asks the Devil to help him build a bridge, promising him the first soul that crosses it. They build the bridge and then Jack tosses a bone over the bridge and a hungry dog runs across.

=== Geographical interpretations ===
Jack o' Kent legends are used to explain a number of geographical formations in the Anglo-Welsh border region.

- Jack is said to have bet the Devil that the Sugar Loaf Mountain was higher than the Malvern Hills. When Jack proved the Devil wrong, the Devil tried to put more soil on top of the Malvern Hills, but his carrier broke and dropped at the end of the island forming a lump.
- The cleft in the western part of Skirrid is said to have been caused by Jack's heel as he jumped onto it from the Sugar Loaf Mountain.
- The standing stones at Trelleck are said to have been thrown there by Jack, the result of a stone-throwing competition held on Trelleck Beacon between him and the Devil. Another version has Jack flinging the stones from Skirrid.
