= Gruffydd Aled Williams =

Welsh scholar

Gruffydd Aled Williams FLSW (born 1943) is a scholar who specialises in Welsh medieval poetry and Renaissance literature. He was brought up in Dinmael, Denbighshire, and Glyndyfrdwy in the former county of Merioneth (now in Denbighshire). Educated at Glyndyfrdwy Primary School, Llangollen Grammar School (later Ysgol Dinas Brân) and the University College of North Wales, Bangor, he graduated in Welsh in 1964. From 1965 to 1970 he was Assistant Lecturer in Welsh at University College, Dublin, and from 1970 he was Lecturer, Senior Lecturer (1984) and Reader (1991) in the Department of Welsh at the University of Wales, Bangor. In 1995 he was appointed Professor of Welsh and Head of the Department of Welsh at the University of Wales, Aberystwyth (later Aberystwyth University), a post he held until his retirement in 2008. He is now an emeritus Professor of the university.

Williams is the author of over 50 articles on medieval poetry and Renaissance literature in periodicals and academic journals on medieval poetry and Renaissance literature. His book Ymryson Edmwnd Prys a Wiliam Cynwal (1986) was awarded the University of Wales' Sir Ellis Griffith Prize. In 1994 he published an edition of the poetry attributed to Owain Cyfeiliog (d. 1170). After retiring he has concentrated his research on the history of Owain Glyndŵr and the literature associated with him. He delivered the British Academy's Sir John Rhŷs Memorial Lecture in 2010 on "More than 'skimble-skamble stuff': the Medieval Poetry Associated with Owain Glyndŵr"" (published 2012), and in 2013 he contributed two articles to Owain Glyndŵr: A Casebook, ed. J. K. Bollard and Michael Livingston. In 2016 his book Dyddiau Olaf Owain Glyndŵr (2015) won the Creative Non-fiction category in Literature Wales's Book of the Year competition.

Williams edited Llên Cymru, the leading academic journal in the field of Welsh literary history, from 1997 until 2012. He is the President of the Merioneth Historical and Record Society and a member of the Council of the Honourable Society of Cymmrodorion. He was elected to the White Robed Order of the Gorsedd of Bards in 2002 and as a Fellow of the Learned Society of Wales in 2014.

Williams is married to Éimear (née Ní Fhloinn) and they have two sons and one daughter.
