= Enchanted Valley Chalet =

- U.S. National Register of Historic Places
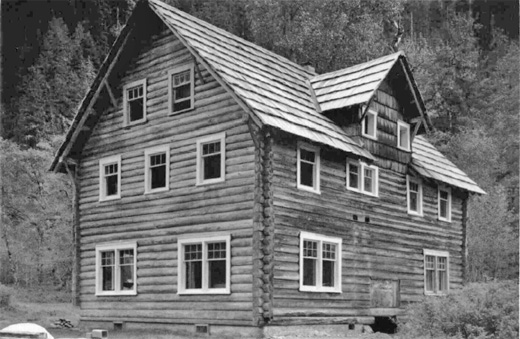

- Location within Washington (state)
- Nearest city: Port Angeles, Washington
- Coordinates: 47°40′31″N 123°23′21″W
- Area: 4 acres (1.6 ha)
- Built: 1930
- Architect: Criswell, Glenn & Tom E.
- Architectural style: Rustic
- MPS: Olympic National Park MPS
- NRHP reference No.: 07000737
- Added to NRHP: July 13, 2007

The Enchanted Valley Chalet is a backcountry lodge in Olympic National Park. The chalet was built in 1931 by Tom E. Criswell, his son Glen and the Olson family of Quinault whose Olympic Recreation Company operated it as a destination lodge deep up the Quinault River Valley, about 13 miles (21 km) from the nearest road access. Under the Olsons' ownership through the 1930s, and for decades under the National Park Service, the chalet has endured as a destination in its own right. It was a popular destination for hikers and horse tours through the 1940s. In 1943, the chalet was closed as an accommodation. It was used for a short period as an Aircraft Warning Service station during World War II, watching for Japanese airplanes. It did not reopen until 1953, after the National Park Service had purchased the Olympic Recreation Company's holdings in 1951, having purchased the Chalet itself in 1939. After a period of neglect, the chalet was restored in 1983-84. It was one of four such accommodations built by the Olympic Recreation Company and the Olympic Chalet Company; Low Divide Chalet, Nine Mile Shelter, Graves Creek Inn and the Enchanted Valley Chalet. Of the four, only the Enchanted Valley Chalet and the bathhouse at Low Divide remain.

== Description ==
The Enchanted Valley Chalet is a 2-1/2 story hewn-log structure with a gabled roof covered in cedar shakes. The exterior walls are entirely constructed of silver fir logs hewn on three sides and notched at the corners with dovetail diagonal-cut joints. The first story logs are 10" in diameter, and the upper story logs are 8" in diameter. Originally, the smaller logs were cut from the tops of larger logs to conserve materials. Several logs on the northeast and northwest walls were replaced in 1980 and 2010. The southwest façade has a front porch and overhang roof supported by log poles. It has been replaced several times and was reconstructed to its original configuration in 2010. The chalet has roof has a 12/12 pitch covered with 36" cedar shakes with a 24" exposure to the weather. The roof is framed with round log rafters, collar ties, and split cedar purlins. The original shakes were split from trees on site, but these were replaced in 1981 and 2010. The roof features a gable dormer on the northwest side. Windows on all exterior walls are of four different types including: 3-over-1 and 6-over-1, double-hung sash windows; wood sash sliders, and four light fixed wood sashes. All windows are wood sash with multi-pane glazing over a single pane. All have plain board trim and a narrow projecting sill.

The original plan of the Enchanted Valley Chalet was a rectangle approximately 28’ x 42’. On the ground floor there were two rooms: a kitchen and a combined lobby/dining room. The second story originally had seven sleeping rooms, one of which became a plumbed bathroom in 1934. The attic was one large room.

Today the ground floor consists of a kitchen, dining room, open living space with partitioned sleeping room, and an emergency shelter. There is one staircase on the east side interior of the building. The second story has six sleeping rooms and one storage room. The attic is still one open room.

The building was restored in 1980 and 2010 and is generally in good condition. The exterior, second floor interior, and attic are remarkably well preserved. These have been maintained in a series of thoughtful preservation projects. The ground floor interior has been altered and worn over time; although many elements are not original to the fabric of the building, the historic configuration is still visible.

== Landscape ==
The Enchanted Valley Chalet stands in a grassy open meadow with nearby surrounding forests consisting of silver fir, cedar, alder, ferns and other Pacific Northwest vegetation. There are a few small alder trees growing approximately 30 feet to the west of the building. Roughly a dozen campsites are scattered along the riverbank, at the forest edge, and in the meadow. There is a water spigot southwest of the building. A cedar hitching post has been rebuilt several times, on the south side of the Chalet. The last one was a casualty of the river channel's movement in 2014.

== Architectural Character and Significance ==
The Enchanted Valley Chalet is historically significant as an example of rustic architecture and recreational development in the western United States. Today it is the largest log structure in the Olympic Mountains and the best surviving example of early recreational development within the national park. It is significant to the local communities in Quinault and Grays Harbor because of its historical association with longtime residents such as the Olson family, and members of the Olympians Hiking Club. Architecturally, the building retains a high degree of integrity in its remote location, setting, vernacular design, materials, craftsmanship, and feeling.

== History ==
The Enchanted Valley Chalet itself was purchased from the Olson's Olympic Recreation Company in 1939, along with the company's Graves Creek Inn. In 1951 the remaining assets of the company were bought by the Park Service. During the early 1980s the chalet was not used for accommodation, with only the first floor used during summers as a seasonal ranger station. It was extensively renovated in 1983-84 with the assistance of the Olympians Hiking Club of Hoquiam. Located in the floodplain of the East Fork of the Quinault River, the chalet is at risk from erosion and the changing course of the river. Mules and horses will be used to drag the chalet 50 to 100 feet to prevent it from falling into the east fork of the Quinault River during September 2014. The chalet was used as an emergency trail shelter in the late 1990s. It was placed on the National Register of Historic Places on July 13, 2007.
