= Purlin =

Structural member in a roof

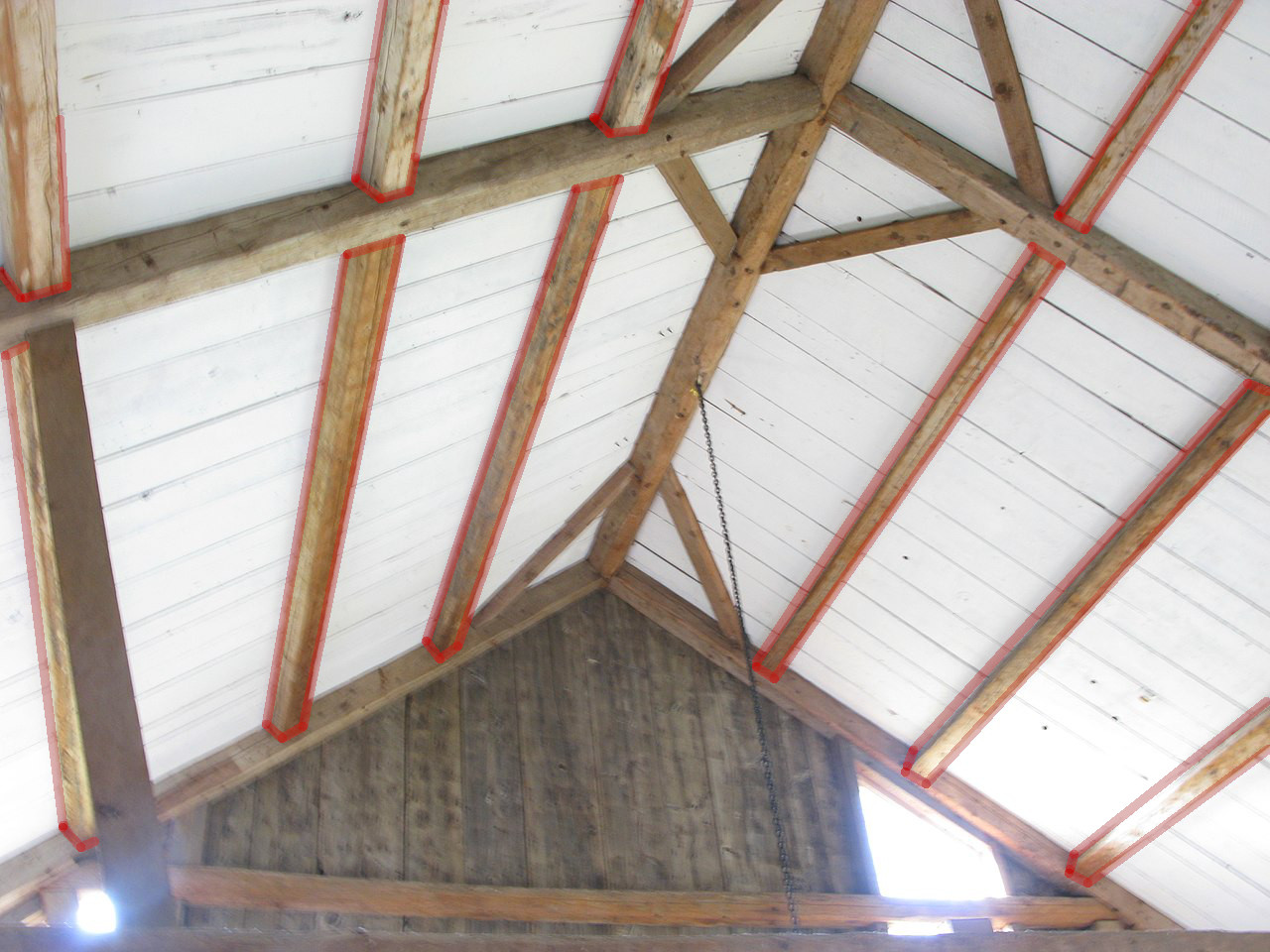
A view of a roof using common purlin framing. The purlins are marked in red. This view is from the inside of the building, below the roof. The rafters are the beams of wood angled upward from the ground. They meet at the top of the gable at a ridge beam (also ridge purlin or roof-tree), which has extra bracing to attach it to the rafters. The purlins are the large beams perpendicular to the rafters; from this shot, it appears that there are three purlins on either side of the roof. The sheathing boards are sometimes called the roof deck and are painted white.

A purlin (or historically purline, purloyne, purling, perling) is a longitudinal, horizontal, structural member in a roof. In traditional timber framing there are three basic types of purlin: purlin plate, principal purlin, and common purlin.

Purlins also appear in steel frame construction. Steel purlins may be painted or greased for protection from the environment.

== Etymology ==
Information on the origin of the term "purlin" is scant. The Oxford Dictionary suggests a French origin, with the earliest quote using a variation of purlin in 1447, though the accuracy of this claim has been disputed.

== In wood construction ==
=== Purlin plate ===
A purlin plate in wood construction is also called an "arcade plate" in European English, "under purlin", and "principal purlin". The term plate means a major, horizontal, supporting timber. Purlin plates are beams which support the mid-span of rafters and are supported by posts. By supporting the rafters they allow longer spans than the rafters alone could span, thus allowing a wider building. Purlin plates are very commonly found in large old barns in North America. A crown plate has similarities to a purlin plate but supports collar beams in the middle of a timber-framed building.

=== Principal purlin ===
Principal purlins in wood construction, also called "major purlins" and "side purlins," are supported by principal rafters and support common rafters in what is known as a "double roof" (a roof framed with a layer of principal rafters and a layer of common rafters). Principal purlins are further classified by how they connect to the principal rafters: "through purlins" pass over the top; "butt purlins" tenon into the sides of the principal rafters; and "clasped purlins," of which only one historic U.S. example is known,) are captured by a collar beam. Through purlins are further categorized as "trenched," "back," or "clasped;" butt purlins are classified as "threaded," "tenoned," and/or "staggered."

=== Common purlin ===
Common purlins in wood construction, also called a "major-rafter minor-purlin system". Common purlins are typically "trenched through" the top sides (backs) of principal rafters and carry vertical roof sheathing (the key to identifying this type of roof system). Common purlin roofs in North America are found in areas settled by the English and may have been a new invention in the Massachusetts Bay Colony. No examples of framed buildings with common purlin roofs have been reported in England, however some stone barns in England have vertically boarded, common purlin roofs. Historically, these roofs are found in New England, the highest concentration in Maine, and isolated parts of New York and along the St. Lawrence River in Canada. One of the oldest surviving examples is in the Coffin House in Newbury, Massachusetts, from 1678. The purpose of a common purlin roof may be they allow a board roof, that is a roof of nothing but vertically laid boards with seams covered with battens or another layer of boards.

== In steel construction ==
In steel construction, the term purlin typically refers to roof framing members that span parallel to the building eave, and support the roof decking or sheeting. The purlins are in turn supported by rafters or walls. Purlins are most commonly used in Steel Framed Building Systems, where Z-shapes are utilized in a manner that allows flexural continuity between spans.

Steel industry practice assigns structural shapes representative designations for convenient shorthand description on drawings and documentation: Channel sections, with or without flange stiffeners, are usually referenced as C shapes; Channel sections without flange stiffeners are also referenced as U shapes; Point symmetric sections that are shaped similar to the letter Z are referenced as Z shapes. Section designations can be regional and even specific to a manufacturer. In steel building construction, secondary members such as purlins (roof) and girts (wall) are frequently cold-formed steel C, Z or U sections, (or mill rolled) C sections.

Cold formed members can be efficient on a weight basis relative to mill rolled sections for secondary member applications. Additionally, Z sections can be nested for transportation bundling and, on the building, lapped at the supports to develop a structurally efficient continuous beam across multiple supports.

== Gallery ==
Note: The sketches in this section reference terminology commonly used in the UK and Australia.

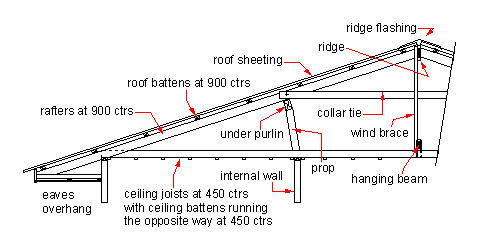
A section through lightweight timber-frame construction showing the position of under purlins

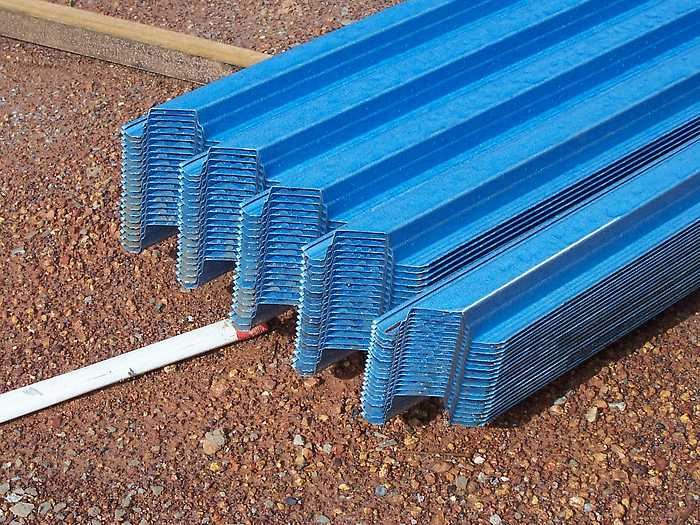
Roll-formed metal roof purlins, also called roof battens. They are cropped to the angle of the purlin top cuts and can be lapped for joining.

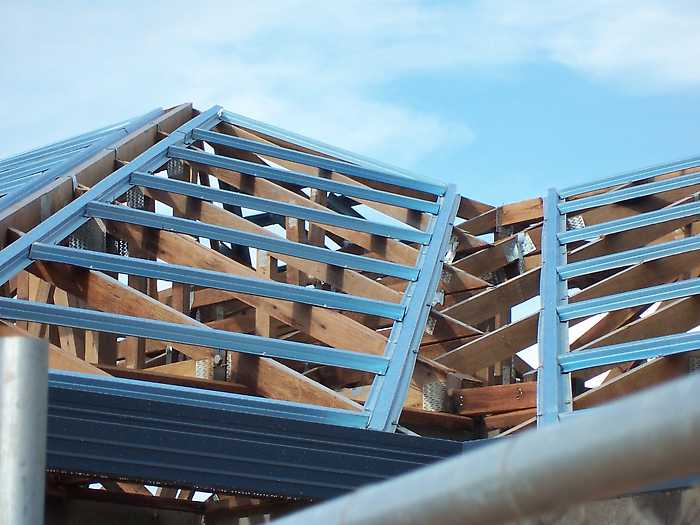
Metal purlins or roof battens screwed to roof gang-nail-type trusses

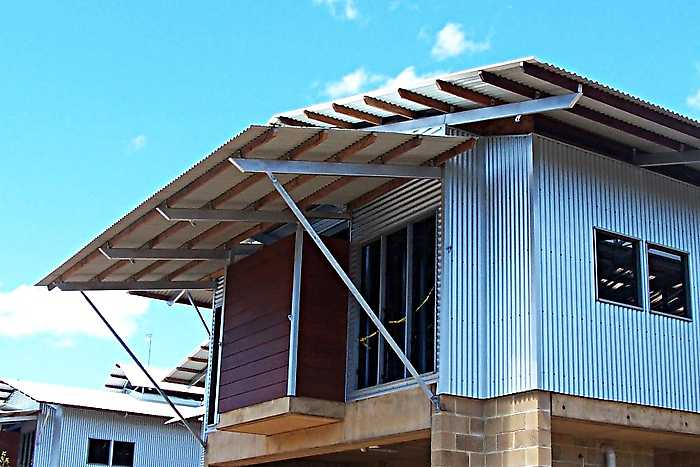
Hardwood purlins fixed to steel supports on a skillion roof and main roof. House under construction, tropical North Australia.

C and Z purlins in all-steel construction

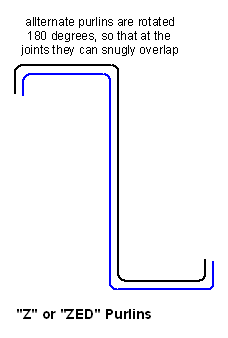
The ability of Z purlins to rotate 180 degrees and fit together

Portal rafters made from C section material supporting Z roof purlins

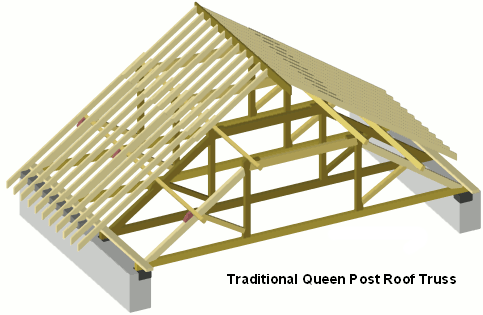
A traditionally framed timber queen post roof showing the placement of principal purlins or purlin plates supporting common rafters

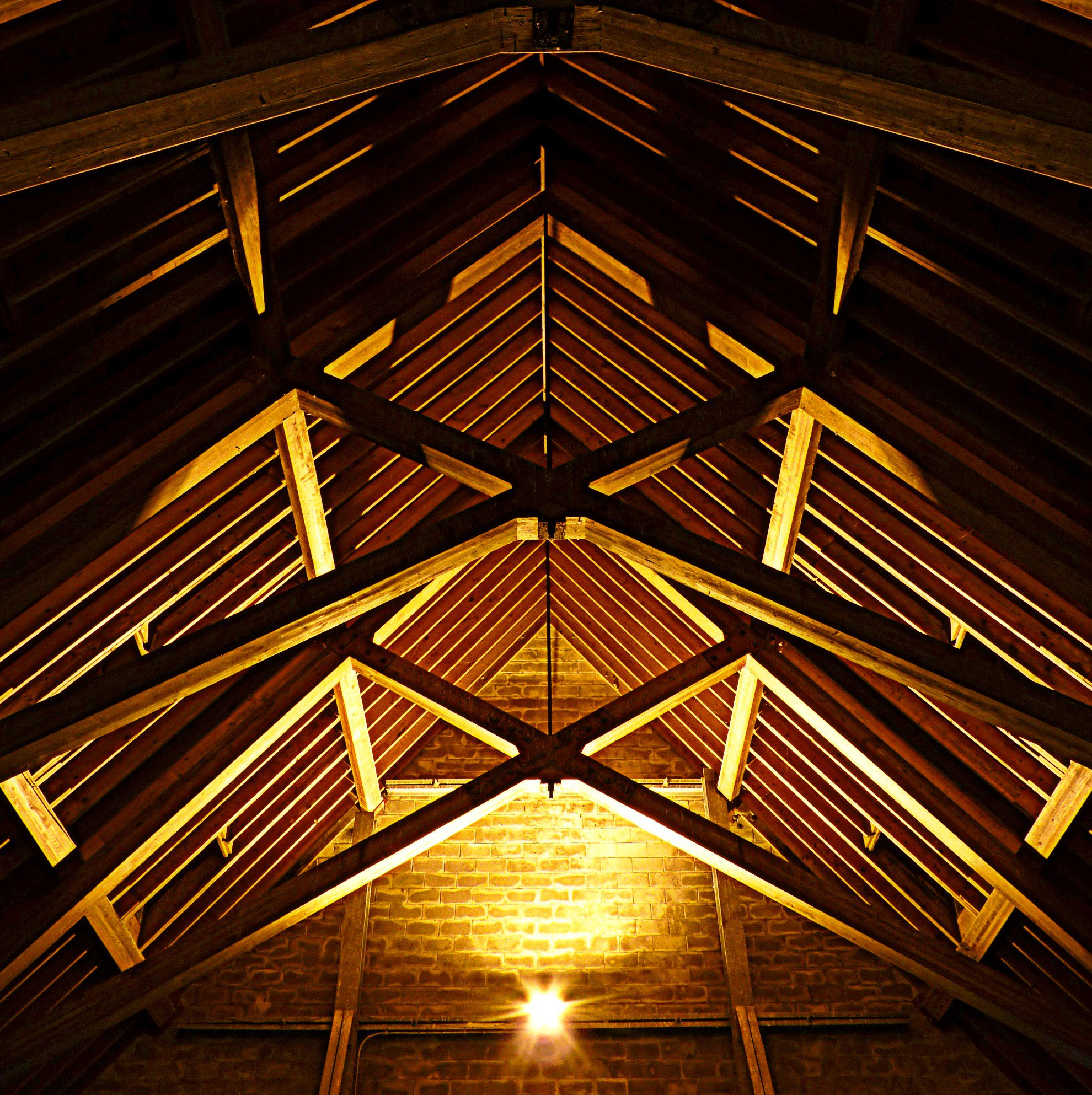
Timber roof truss with purlins

== See also ==
- Girt
- Joist
- Roof construction
- Timber roof trusses
