= Battle of Stalling Down =

Coordinates: 51.4619°N 3.4179°W

- Part of Welsh Revolt
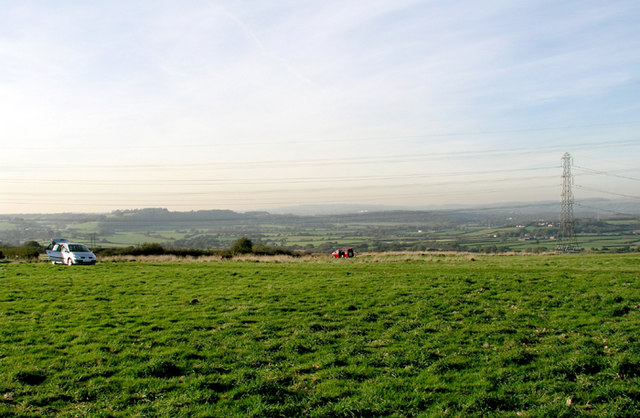
- Stalling Down
Date	c. 1403
Location	Stalling Down, Glamorgan, Wales
Result	Welsh victory

Belligerents
Principality of Wales	Kingdom of England

Commanders and leaders
Owain Glyndŵr; Rhys Gethin; Cadwgan Y Fwyell	King Henry IV

Strength
Unknown	Unknown

Casualties and losses
	Heavy

The Battle of Stalling Down, also known as the Battle of Bryn Owen, is reputed by the literary forger, Iolo Morganwg, to have taken place between late autumn or early winter of 1400/1401 between a Welsh army under Owain Glyndŵr and an English army under King Henry IV of England. It was set during the Welsh Revolt of 1400–1415.

== Location ==
Stalling Down is a rolling area of open land a few miles east of the town of Cowbridge, now the village common of St Hilary in the Vale of Glamorgan. We only have Iolo Morganwg’s account for the battle which does not give an exact site. The general site is known locally as Bryn Owen, meaning Owen's Hill.

The site was known as Stallington, evolving to Stalling Down. A Roman road runs over the hill as it traverses the area and would have been a convenient route for moving a very large army along for the English.

== The Opposing Forces ==
According to Iolo Morganwg’s fanciful account, the Welsh army included a small French contingent assimilated into forces from Morgannwg led by Rhys Gethin ('swarthy Rhys') and Cadwgan, Lord of Glyn Rhondda commanded another contingent from the Rhondda Valleys region. Cadwgan had a home at Aberochwy, near what is today Treorchy. He fought using a battle axe as his weapon of choice and was later known as Cadwgan of the Battle Axe. Owain Glyndŵr is also reported to have been present in the battle in person.

== Outcome ==
The battle is said by Iolo to have lasted 18 hours and resulted in an appalling defeat for the King's army. The blood was fetlock deep on the horses that survived the battle.

The English army retreated through Cardiff pursued by the Welsh in terrible conditions, which included a thunderstorm and flooding.

== Examination of Evidence ==
In nearby Llanblethian church in 1896 explorations prior to Victorian church improvements revealed an oak plank in the floor, which when prised up, revealed a stone stairway descending to a crypt. Inside the crypt were piled three hundred male skeletons, without coffins, and the only known battle to have taken place in this area is Stalling Down. The crypt measured some seventeen feet by fifteen and stood seven feet high at its highest point, the apex of the arched and vaulted roof. Small wall openings to the exterior had been covered up on the outside by earth, effectively sealing the crypt to the outside world. The bones were immediately buried in the churchyard. The clerk's pew contains an inscription that this church was the burial place of the Sweeting family 'before the war with Owen Glyndŵr'. The church is some three miles from the battle ground. However, recent scholarship is of the opinion that the crypt was just the parish charnel house and had nothing to do with a battle

More recently, historians have rightly dismissed the veracity of the report of a battle at Stalling Down; for example, a modern authority on Glyndŵr, the late R. R. Davies, made no mention of it in his account of the revolt, published in 1995. The problem lies in the fact that the earliest recorded reference to the battle is late, and is found in the works of the 18th-century forger Iolo Morganwg, although Morganwg's account held considerable sway, and was repeated by several later writers, including the Edwardian historian Arthur Bradley in his 1901 biography of Owain Glyndŵr. In it, he places the battle in 1405, calling it the 'battle of Bryn Owen'.

Therefore, as a result of the lack of evidence it is safe to conclude that the Battle of Stalling Down never occurred. The discovery of a crypt in the area containing three hundred male skeletons without coffins is irrelevant as it was most probably the parish charnel house. The fact there is some local tradition to be found in connection with the battle is based on folk etymology of place names like ‘Bryn Owen’ - Owen could literally have been anyone of that common name - and ‘Kingshill’, which again could refer to any king. The context of a battle in either 1400/1401 or 1405 according well with our understanding of the progress of Glyndŵr's revolt is pure fancy.

== Bibliography ==
- Bradley, Arthur (1901). Owain Glyndŵr.
- Breverton, Terry (2013). Owain Glyndwr: The Story of the Last Prince of Wales. Stroud: Amberley Publishing. ISBN 978-1-4456-1498-4.
- Davies, R. R. (1995). The Revolt of Owain Glyn Dŵr. Oxford.
