= Owain Glyndŵr =

Welsh rebel and pretender (died c. 1416)

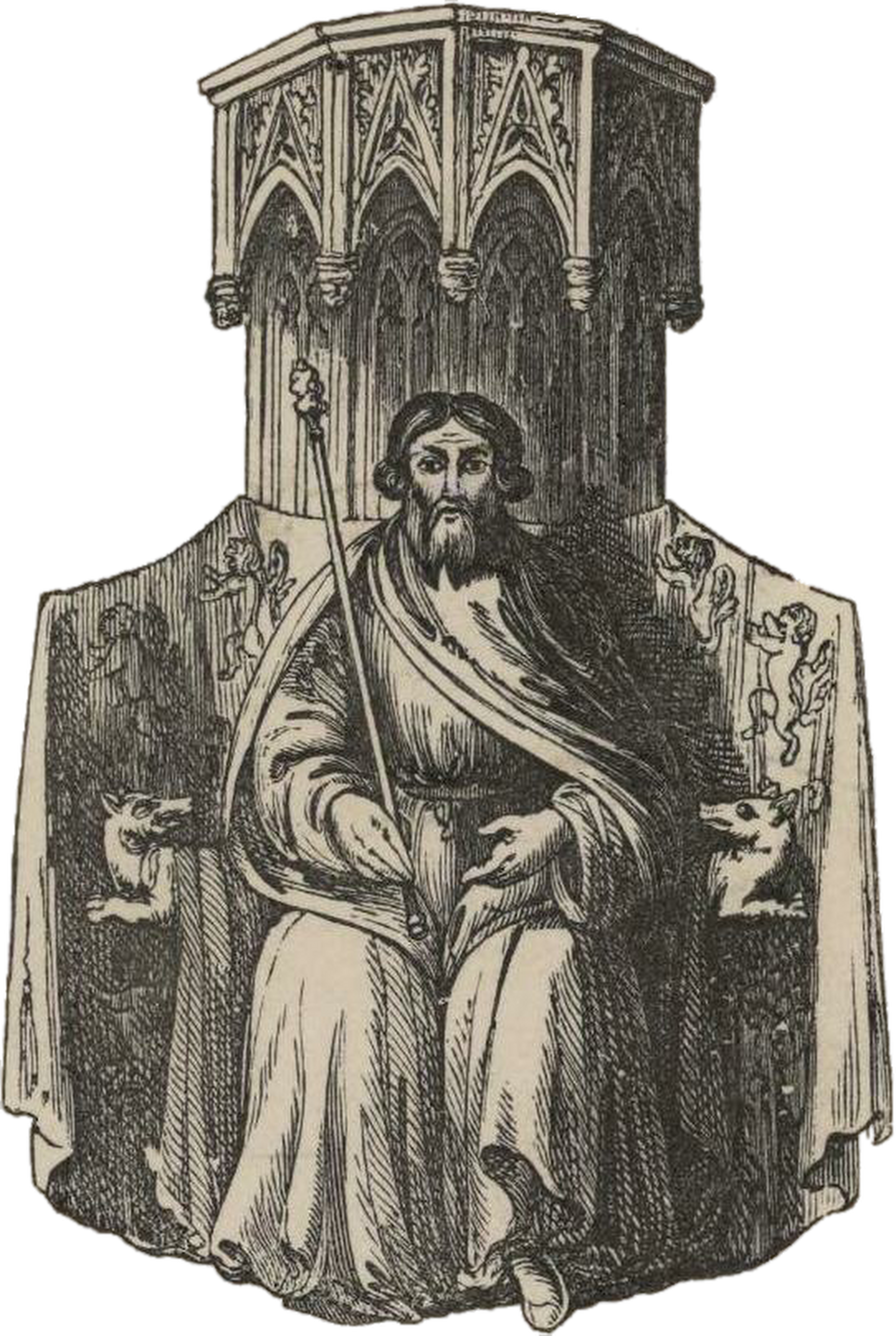
- A nineteenth-century illustration of Owain Glyndŵr based on the design of his great seal

Prince of Wales
- Pretence: 16 September 1400 – c. 1416
- Predecessor: Owain Lawgoch
- Successor: No further Welsh claimants
- Born: c. 1359 or earlier
- Died: c. 1416 (aged 56–57); Herefordshire (possibly)
- Burial: Unknown Herefordshire (possibly, at first) Cwmhir Abbey (possibly, reburial)
- Spouse: Margaret Hanmer
- Issue among others: Gruffudd ab Owain Glyndŵr; Maredudd ab Owain Glyndŵr; Alys ferch Owain Glyndŵr; Catrin ferch Owain Glyndŵr
- Dynasty: Lleision
- Father: Gruffudd Fychan
- Mother: Elen ferch Tomas
- Military career
- Allegiance: England (1385 – 1387); Wales (1400 – c. 1416)
- Conflicts Battles: 1385 invasion of Scotland; Hundred Years' War; Glyndŵr rebellion See list: Battle of Margate (1387) Battle of Mynydd Hyddgen (1401) Battle of Tuthill (1401) Battle of Bryn Glas (1402) Battle of Stalling Down (c. 1403)

Owain ap Gruffudd Fychan (Note: Welsh pronunciation: [ˈoʊain ap ˈɡrɨ̞fɨ̞ð ˈvəχan]) or Owain Glyndŵr (Note: Welsh pronunciation: [ˈoʊain ˈɡlɨ̞nduːr], also spelled Glyn Dŵr; anglicised as Owen Glendower) (c. 1359 – c. 1416) was a Welsh nobleman and military commander in the late Middle Ages who led a revolt with the aim of establishing an independent Wales free from English rule. Owain was acclaimed Prince of Wales by his supporters on 16 September 1400, and following initial successes, the rebellion was able to take control of the entirety of the country between 1404 and 1405. However, an increase of English military pressure and the lack of foreign aid resulted in the loss of all rebel territory by 1409, after which Owain continued sporadic resistance until his disappearance from the historical record in 1412. He was never captured, and died in hiding around 1416.

During the year 1400, Owain, a Welsh soldier and Lord of Glyndyfrdwy, had a dispute with his English neighbour Reginald de Grey, a symptom of larger animosity between the Welsh and English in Wales which ultimately led to a national revolt that pitted common Welsh countrymen and nobles against the English military. In response to the rebellion, discriminatory penal laws were implemented against the Welsh people; this deepened civil unrest and significantly increased support for Owain across Wales. Then, in 1404, after a series of successful castle sieges and several battlefield victories for the Welsh, Owain gained control of most of Wales and held a parliament in Machynlleth in the presence of envoys from France, Scotland, the Spanish kingdoms of Castille and Leon, and representatives from every region of Wales. Military aid was given to the rebellion from France, Brittany, and Scotland. Owain wrote in the Pennal Letter of 1406 that he had plans to build two universities, one in North Wales and one in South Wales, and reinstate the traditional Welsh laws of Hywel Dda, and to expand Wales' borders into England, which would have affected the structure of the Church.

The war continued, and over the next several years, the English gradually gained control of large parts of Wales. By 1409 the rebellion’s last remaining castles of Harlech and Aberystwyth had been captured by English forces. Owain refused two royal pardons and retreated to the Welsh hills and mountains with his remaining forces, where he continued to resist English rule by using guerrilla warfare tactics, until his disappearance from the historical record in 1412.

Owain was never captured or killed, and the circumstances surrounding his death are unknown. In Welsh culture he acquired a mythical status alongside Cadwaladr, Cynon ap Clydno and King Arthur as a folk hero, and was seen as the 'Son of Destiny', just as was Owain Lawgoch a few decades earlier. He also appears in William Shakespeare's play Henry IV, Part 1 as the character Owen Glendower.

== Life before the revolt, c. 1359 – 1400 ==
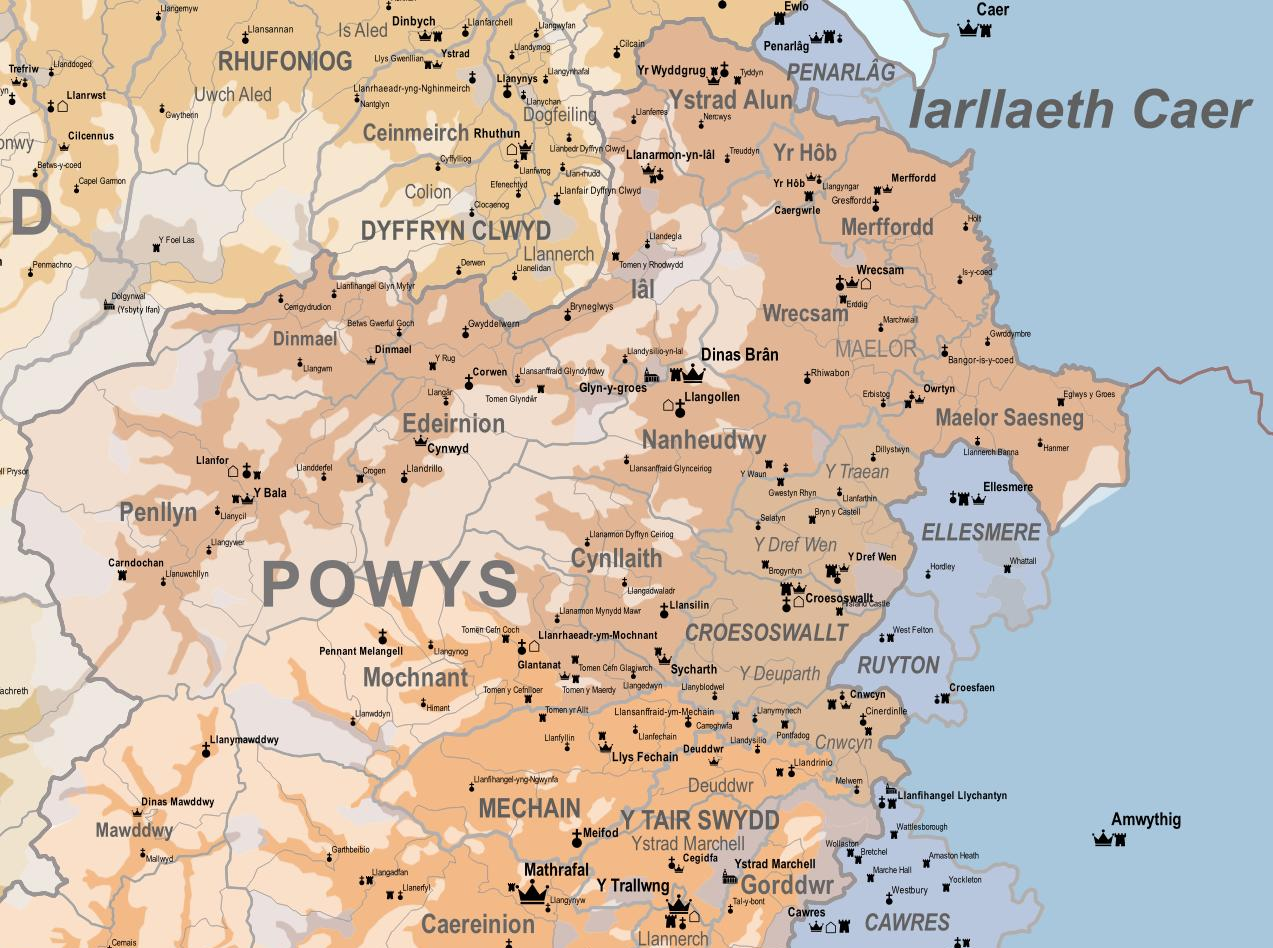
A map of the cantrefi and commotes of Northern Powys in the thirteenth century. Cynllaith is in the middle of the map, Llansantfraid Glyndyfrdwy is to the north.

=== Background and family ===
Owain ap Gruffudd Fychan was born in or before 1359, (Note: Owain's birth-year may be inferred from a contemporary record of the 1386 Scrope trial, which gives his age as "twenty-seven years and more". See Nicolas 1832, pp. 254–255. Two other spurious dates are printed in Thomas Pennant's Tour in Wales, namely 28 May 1354 or 1349, the year the Black Death arrived in Wales. See Pennant 1784, p. 326. However, these derive respectively from the much later eighteenth-century NLW MS 2021B and seventeenth-century NLW MS 3039B, and were rejected by J. E. Lloyd. See Lloyd 1931, p. 18.) the son of Gruffudd Fychan and Elen ferch Tomas. Owain's father's family descended from another, earlier Gruffudd Fychan, younger brother of Llywelyn Fychan, the last lord of Northern Powys, killed alongside Llywelyn ap Gruffudd in the last stage of the Edwardian Conquest of Wales, and ultimately from Madog ap Maredudd, last ruler of a united Powys. Following the Conquest, the earlier Gruffudd Fychan swore fealty to King Edward and was permitted on 12 February 1283 to hold his land of the king by 'Welsh barony', a tenure largely confined to members of the former royal dynasties of Wales under which Gruffudd and his descendants owed the Crown only military service and retained the right to hold court on their lands. (Note: For discussions on this tenure, see Carr 1963–1964 and Carr 1964.) Owain's father, the later Gruffudd Fychan, held two lordships at opposite ends of the Berwyn range: that of the vill of Glyndyfrdwy in Meirioneth within the Principality of Wales, and half of Cynllaith in the Marcher lordship of Chirk. Little of Gruffudd's career is recorded, though from 1346 to 1348 he held the stewardship of the Richard Fitzalan, Earl of Arundel's lordship of Oswestry. Gruffudd's own father, Gruffudd Llwyd, was steward of the Crown lordship of Maelor Saesneg in 1331, and married a daughter of John V Lestrange of Knockin, an English nobleman of the Shropshire border. Gruffudd Llwyd abandoned the partible succession customary in native Welsh law in favour of primogeniture in tail on the English model, keeping his estates undivided and his descendants wealthy.

Owain's mother Elen descended from Gruffudd, eldest son of the Lord Rhys of Deheubarth, and on the deaths of her uncle and brother, the last males of their dynasty, inherited half the commote of Is Coed in Ceredigion. (Note: Later known as 'Iscoed Glyndŵr' after Owain.) She descended also in the female line from the dynasty of Gwynedd, and even from King John through his daughter Joan, wife of Llywelyn ab Iorwerth of Gwynedd. Elen and her ancestors likewise held their land by 'Welsh barony'. Owain's direct descent from the three principal Welsh dynasties of the pre-Conquest era made him a singular figure in fourteenth-century Wales. (Note: The poet Iolo Goch remarked on this distinction, singing to Owain before the revolt a poem that celebrated his descent from these dynasties and urged him to claim his legal rights under English rule to Powys as the senior representative of its old dynasty. During the rebellion itself, however, Owain invoked only his supposed descent from Cadwaladr ap Cadwallon, a seventh-century king of Gwynedd recorded as the last King of the Britons in Geoffrey of Monmouth's immensely popular pseudo-history De gestis Britonum, and the subject of much medieval Welsh literature prophesying him as a future deliverer of the Welsh people.)

=== Inheritance and education ===
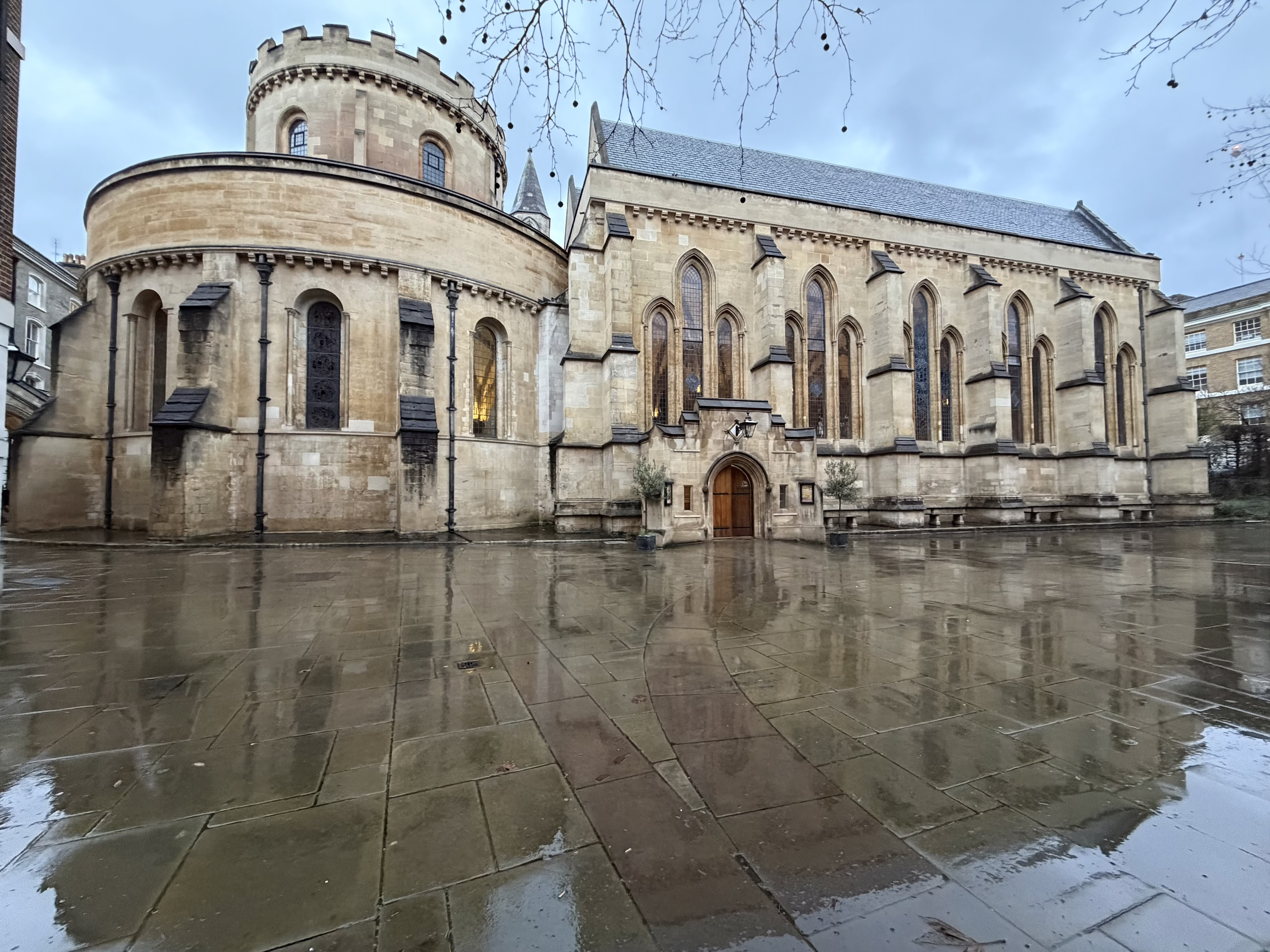
Temple Church. Constructed in the twelfth century, it is the only surviving medieval building in the Inns of Court, serving the Inner and Middle Temples.

Gruffudd Fychan died shortly before 1370, leaving to Owain his estates in Cynllaith and Glyndyfrdwy, after which Owain would be known as 'Owain Glyndŵr'. Owain may have spent his youth after his father's death as a page or esquire in the court of the Fitzalan earls of Arundel; Richard Fitzalan, whom Gruffudd Fychan had served as steward, was sufficiently close with the family to loan £20 to Elen ferch Tomas in 1370. Owain may have been introduced to the earls' court by David Hanmer, an important lawyer from Maelor Saesneg with connection to the earls of Arundel and barons of Powis who was like Owain of mixed English and Welsh background. Gruffudd Fychan's estates may also have been taken into the custody of Hanmer until Owain's majority, with the young Owain having been his ward. Perhaps under the direction of his guardian, Owain may himself have trained in the legal profession for as many as seven years at the Inns of Court towards the end of the reign of Edward III, who died in 1377. (Note: Records of students enrolled at the Inns of Court survive only from 1422 onwards.) However, in the fourteenth century the Inns of Court were, according to J. E. Lloyd, paraphrasing the fifteenth-century judge John Fortescue, "a kind of upper-class university, too expensive for any but the well-to-do and providing an education which was more social than professional."

=== Early career ===
Owain continued in the service of the Fitzalan earls of Arundel following the end of his education. The earl whom his father had served died in 1377, and was succeeded by his son, also named Richard. Owain's service to the younger Richard Fitzalan is one of the most well-attested periods of his career prior to his rebellion. Before the first records of his service to Arundel, however, Owain appears to have been married to Margaret Hanmer, daughter of David Hanmer. The date of this marriage is disputed. The unreliable nineteenth-century antiquarian William Owen dated Owain's marriage to 1383, but R. R. Davies suggested a date in the 1370s whilst Owain was the ward of her father, drawing a parallel with the marriage of Owain's grandfather Gruffudd Llwyd whilst underage with the daughter of his guardian in 1304.

==== Service in Scotland, 1384 – 1385 ====
On 1 March 1384, Owain and his brother Tudur were listed as men-at-arms among the retainers of Sir Gregory Sais, guardian of the town of Berwick-upon-Tweed on the English-Scottish border. Gregory Sais was, according to A. D. Carr, "perhaps the greatest of the Welsh captains of this period" and a close confidant of the Black Prince in the Edwardian phase of the Hundred Years' War. Owain also likely became acquainted during his assignment in Berwick with Henry Percy, Earl of Northumberland and his son Hotspur, who both would feature prominently in his future. In August 1385, King Richard II launched an inconclusive campaign against Scotland which nevertheless razed and plundered its way to Edinburgh. Owain's participation in this campaign is not recorded in contemporary records, but his participation in it is confirmed by his own testimony in the following year. At the age of twenty-seven, Owain was called to give evidence for the High Court of Chivalry on 3 September 1386 in Chester as part of the proceedings of the Scrope v Grosvenor trial. Richard Scrope brought a suit seeking to determine who could bear a coat of arms blazoned Azure, a bend Or against Robert Grosvenor after he saw Grosvenor displaying arms identical to his own on the Scottish campaign; the case lasted for six years. Owain testified that he had seen Grosvenor bear these arms on the expedition in Scotland and that the arms were generally known to be his in Cheshire and Flintshire, as did his brother Tudur, who was then twenty-four. Owain's brothers-in-law John Hanmer and Robert Puleston, the latter married to Owain's sister Lowri, also testified in this trial and were earlier involved in the same Scottish campaign. These men may have served in this campaign in the retinue of the earl of Arundel, or perhaps been mustered directly by Richard II as part of the sizeable contingent from the county palatine of Chester.

==== In Arundel's retinue, 1387 ====
Owain and his brother Tudur were mustered in Sandwich on 13 March 1387 as part of the retinue of his old acquaintance, Richard Fitzalan, earl of Arundel. Since 1385, England had been threatened annually by a French naval invasion from Flanders. On 10 December 1386, Richard II had been given a commission to lead 2500 men in a campaign to pre-emptively strike the Franco-Flemish navy commencing March 1387. King Richard had been stripped of his control over England's government in the Wonderful Parliament a month prior, and Arundel was one of the leading opponents of the king, at the centre of the kingdom's political life. Arundel commanded his men in a fleet as admiral, and routed a predominantly Flemish wine fleet sailing home from La Rochelle in the Battle of Margate on 24 March, England's first notable success at sea since the resumption of war with France. The opposing fleet attempted to break through the English navy to Sluis, but was intercepted and forced to fight or beach at Cadzand shore; the battle's spoils included more than 8000 tuns of Poitevin and Saintongeais wine, flooding the English market. Owain was not knighted by Arundel following the battle, though many of his other squires were; this led R. R. Davies to note that though Owain was "by far the greatest of 'the barons of Wales', he could not even make it to the rank of a knight in England".

==== An early retirement? 1387 – 1400 ====
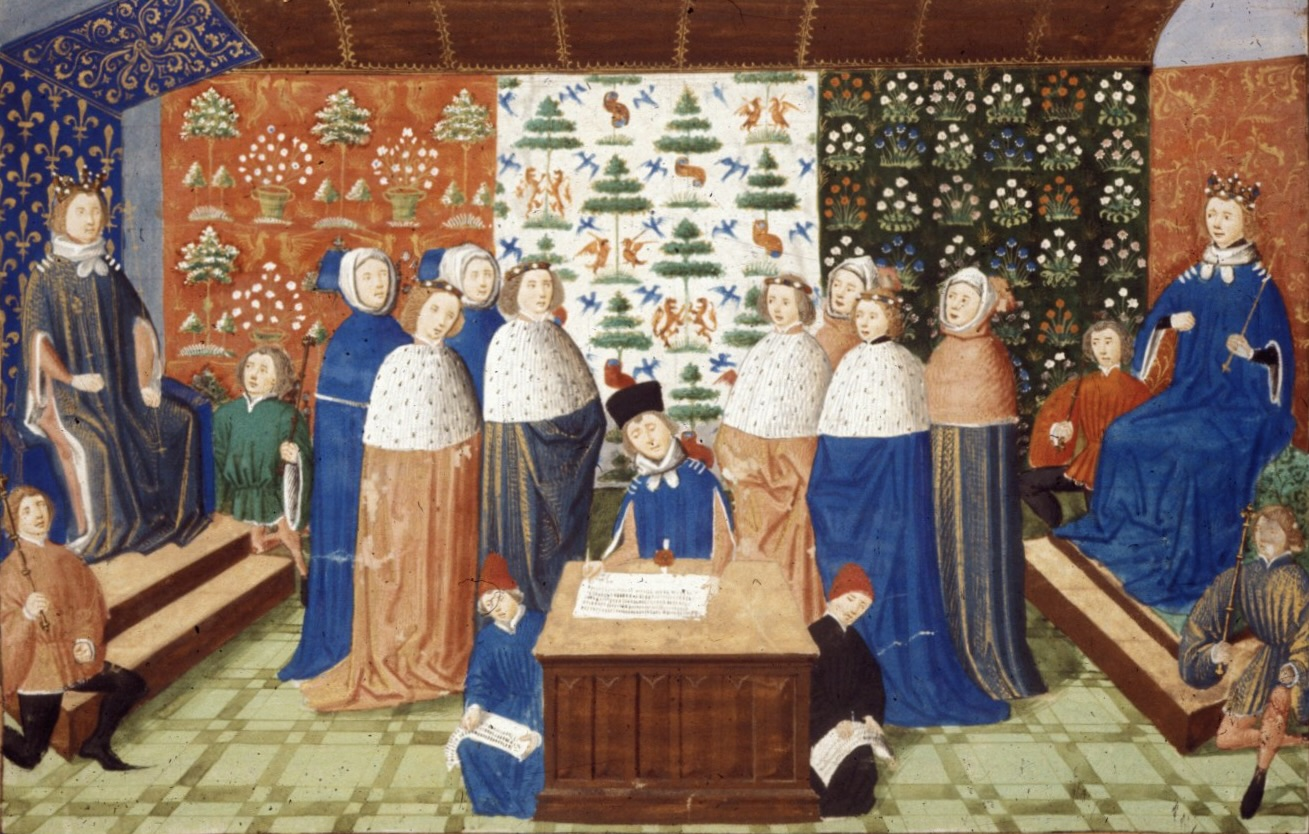
Charles VI and Richard II making peace at Leulinghem in 1389.

Owain's father-in-law David Hanmer died in early summer 1387, and by July, Owain had returned to settle the family affairs, just as Arundel began to take action against Robert de Vere, the earl of Oxford and Richard II's favourite. He does not appear to have taken part in any further campaigns under Arundel, as though Owain was enrolled in the earl's retinue at the head of his esquires with the aim of serving in France in 1388, his name was crossed out in the lists, meaning he did not serve. For the next decade, Owain is not mentioned in any surviving records save on 28 June 1397, when the Roman pope Boniface IX granted an indult to Owain and Margaret Hanmer allowing a confessor to grant them plenary remission in the hour of death. J. E. Lloyd, repeated by R. R. Davies, imagined Owain in these years "at ease, wealthy, generous, respected, [and] happy in the life of his home." Ultimately, Owain's hopes for advancement in a military career may have been dashed by the signing of a peace treaty with France in 1389 following Richard II's return to power at Arundel's expense; his other obvious patron, Gregory Sais, died in 1390. No record survives of Owain serving Arundel in an administrative capacity as Gruffudd Fychan served the earl's father, and so the relationship between the two may have at some point cooled.

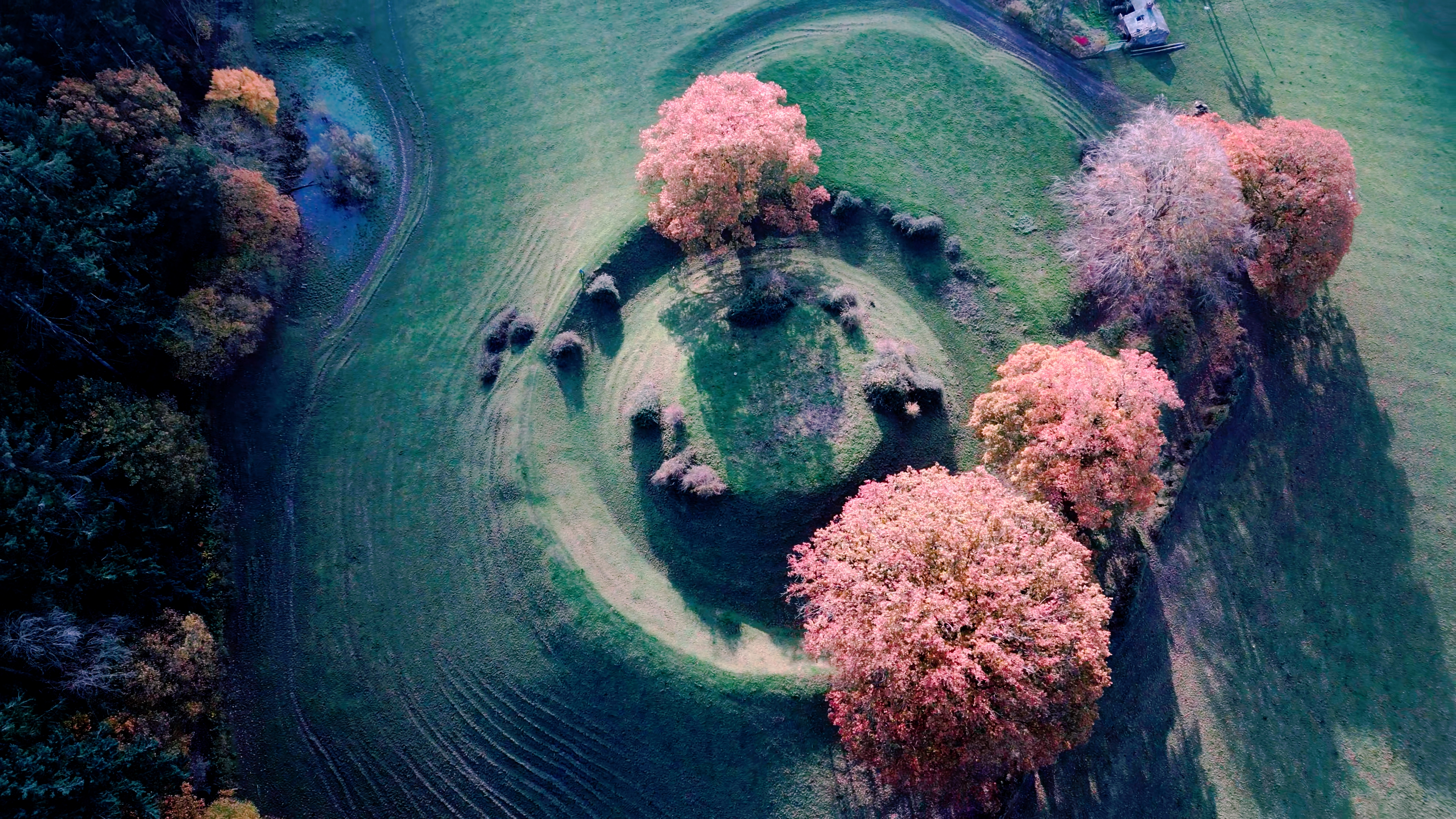
An aerial view of the remains of the motte and bailey of Owain's home at Sycharth.

Though Owain does not appear in traditional historical sources in this period, he was a patron of traditional Welsh poets, including Gruffudd Llwyd and Iolo Goch, a successor to Dafydd ap Gwilym and the leading cywyddwr (Note: i.e. one composing in the cywydd, a metre considered unsuited for formal poetry before Iolo's time.) of his day. Iolo sang three poems to Owain before 1400: one praising his ancestry, one praising him, sung around 1385, and one to his court in Sycharth, sung around 1390. Despite his cognomen deriving from Glyndwfrdwy, Owain's main residence and main source of income appears to have been Sycharth, a moated house in his half of Cynllaith. While Owain's wealth was modest by English standards, he was among the wealthiest of the native Welsh nobility, and may have had an income of up to £70 per annum. Owain himself ordered the construction of the house which hosted Iolo. Iolo's poem praising Owain's ancestry notes his descent from the pre-Conquest princes Rhys ap Gruffudd of Deheubarth, Bleddyn ap Cynfyn of Powys, and Gruffudd ap Cynan of Gwynedd, urging Owain to press his claim to all Powys as his rightful inheritance, while his poem praising Owain himself mentions his service with Gregory Sais in Scotland.

According to Dafydd Johnston, the "most satisfying poem" to Owain by Iolo is Iolo's poem celebrating Sycharth, known by the title "Owain Glyndŵr's Court". The poem describes Sycharth as a moated site ringed by water and approached by a bridge and a single gate, its timber halls raised on four great pillars atop a green hill. Iolo dwells on the symmetry and joinery of the building, likening its coupled roof-timbers and cruciform plan to St Patrick's Cathedral in Dublin and the new cloister of Westminster Abbey, and enumerating nine matching halls, nine wardrobes, a tiled roof and a smoking chimney, and glazed chapels flanking the hall. (Note: On the architectural vocabulary, see Johnston 1993, pp. 165–166, notes to 10.27, 10.29–30, 10.37) The surrounding estate is catalogued with equal precision: a watermill, a stone dovecot, a fishpond stocked with pike and sewin, an orchard and vineyard, land producing Owain's food worked by his serfs, peacocks and herons, a rabbit warren and a deer park, with imported Shrewsbury ale, bragget, wine and white bread on the table. The poem then turns to Owain's family, praising his wife Margaret as the finest of women, generous with wine and mead and noble by birth and disposition, and their children, who come in pairs as a "fine nestful of chieftains", before closing on the openness of the household itself:

Anfynych iawn fu yno
Weled na chliced na chlo,
Na phorthoriaeth ni wnaeth neb;
Ni bydd eisiau, budd oseb,
Na gwall na newyn na gwarth,
Na syched fyth yn Sycharth.
Gorau Cymro, tro trylew,
Piau'r wlad, lin Pywer Lew,
Gwr meingryf, gorau mangre,
A phiau'r llys, hoff yw'r lle.

— Iolo Goch, 'Llys Owain Glyndŵr', lines 87–96
Translation:

Very rarely was bolt or lock
to be seen there,
nor did anyone act as porter;
there will be no want, beneficial gift,
nor lack nor hunger nor shame,
nor ever thirst in Sycharth.
The best Welshman, valorous feat,
owns the country, of Pywer Lew's line,
slender strong man, best spot,
and owns the court, splendid is the place.

— Translation by Dafydd Johnston

Sycharth was the centre of the fertile lands of the eastern half of Cynllaith in the lordship of Chirk, only a mile from the border with England, yet at the time still thoroughly Welsh in character. Owain's share of Cynllaith looked eastward to England: Sycharth lay a mere ten miles from the Arundel castle of Chirk, the market town of Oswestry, and the castles of Whittington and Knockin, the residences of two other Marcher baronial families, the Fitzwarins and the Lestranges, with Chester and Shrewsbury beyond. The fine quality of Owain's home was noted in a letter by none other than Prince Hal to his father Henry IV following its destruction during the rebellion in 1402; the prince described Sycharth as "a well-built house... [with] a fine lodge in his park".

=== Prelude to rebellion ===
In the late 1390s, a series of events occurred which cornered Owain, and forced his ambitions towards a rebellion. The events would later be called the "Welsh Revolt", "the Glyndŵr Rising" (within Wales), or the "Last War of Independence". His neighbour, Baron Grey of Ruthin, had seized control of some land, for which Owain appealed to the English Parliament; however, Owain's petition for redress was ignored. Later, in 1400, Lord Grey did not inform Owain in time about a royal command to levy feudal troops for Scottish border service, thus enabling him to call Owain a traitor in London court circles. Lord Grey had stature in the royal court of Henry IV. The law courts refused to hear the case, or it was delayed because Lord Grey prevented Owain's letter from reaching the King, which would have repercussions. Sources state that Owain was under threat because he had written an angry letter to Lord Grey, boasting that lands had come into his possession, and he had stolen some of Lord Grey's horses; and believing Lord Grey had threatened to "burn and slay" within his lands, he threatened retaliation in the same manner. Lord Grey then denied making the initial threat to burn and slay, and replied that he would take the incriminating letter to Henry IV's council and that Owain would hang for the admission of theft and treason contained within the letter. The deposed king, Richard II, had support in Wales, and in January 1400 serious civil disorder broke out in the English border city of Chester after the public execution of an officer of Richard II.

== Early rebellion, 1400 – 1404 ==
Wales during the Glyndŵr rebellion (1400–1409). Click on the icons for details.

Important battle
Castle garrisoned by English forces
Castle unsuccessfully besieged by Welsh forces
Castle possibly sacked by Welsh forces
Castle sacked or occupied by Welsh forces (dates held)
Welsh campaign of 1400
Welsh campaign of 1403
Franco-Welsh campaign of 1405
Possible route of 1405 campaign

At Sycharth on 16 September 1400, in front of his immediate family, his in-laws, Welsh people from Berwyn, friends from North-East Wales, the Dean of St Asaph totalling 300 men, Owain Glyndŵr prophecised that he was the person to save his people from the English invasions, and proclaimed himself the Prince of Wales. The following day, he instigated a 15-year rebellion against the rule of Henry IV. Then came a number of initial confrontations between Henry IV and Owain's followers in September and October 1400, as the revolt began to spread around North Wales. Owain was immediately proclaimed Prince of Wales by his followers and subsequently launched an assault on Lord Grey's territories, burning Ruthin. They continued to Denbigh, Rhuddlan, Flint, Holt, Oswestry and Welshpool, all of which were seen as English towns in Wales. The initial revolt got the attention of the King of England after letters were sent asking for military assistance to combat the Welsh rebels. Much of northern and central Wales went over to Owain, and from then on, he would only make an appearance to attack his enemy, his army using effective guerrilla warfare tactics against the English occupying territories.

On Good Friday (1 April) 1401, 40 of Glyndwr's men who were led by his cousins, Rhys ap Tudur and Gwilym ap Tudur, took Conwy Castle in North Wales. In response, King Henry IV appointed Henry Percy (Hotspur) to bring the country to order. A month later, the King and the English parliament issued an amnesty which applied to all rebels with the exception of Owain and his cousins, the Tudurs; however, both the Tudurs were eventually pardoned after they gave up Conwy Castle on 28 May that same year. Hotspur won a battle at Cadair Idris two days later, but that was to be his final service for the King of England, as he retired his command as leader of the English troops after dealing with Owain. During that time in the spring of 1401, Owain appears in South Wales.

In June, Owain scored his first major victory in the field at Mynydd Hyddgen on Pumlumon; however, retaliation by Henry IV on Strata Florida Abbey was to follow in October that same year. The rebel uprising had occupied all of North Wales; labourers seized whatever weapons they could, and farmers sold their cattle to buy arms. Secret meetings were held everywhere, and bards "wandered about as messengers of sedition." Henry IV heard of a Welsh uprising at Leicester; Henry's army wandered North Wales to Anglesey and drove out Franciscan friars who favoured Richard II. All the while Owain, who was in hiding, had his estate at Sycharth forfeited by the King to John Beaufort, 1st Earl of Somerset on 9 November 1400. By autumn, Gwynedd and Ceredigion (which temporarily submitted to England for a pardon) and Powys adhered to the rising against the English rule by supporting the rebellion. Owain's attempts at stoking rebellion with help from the Scottish and Irish were quashed, with the English showing no mercy and hanging some messengers.

As a response to the situation of warfare in Wales, the English Parliament between 1401 and 1402 enacted penal laws against the Welsh, designed to coerce submission in Wales, but the result was to create resentment that pushed many Welshmen into the rebellion. In the same year, Owain captured his archenemy Baron Grey de Ruthyn. He held him for almost a year until he received a substantial ransom from Henry. In June 1402, Owain defeated an English force led by Sir Edmund Mortimer near Pilleth (the Battle of Bryn Glas), where Mortimer was captured. Owain offered to release Mortimer for a large ransom but, in sharp contrast to his attitude to de Grey, Henry IV refused to pay. Mortimer's nephew could be said to have had a greater claim to the English throne than Henry himself, so his speedy release was not an option. In response, Mortimer negotiated an alliance with Owain and married one of Owain's daughters. It is also in 1402 that mention of the French and the people of Flanders helping Owain's daughter Janet, who was negotiating on the continent for her father for two years until 1404.

News of the rebellion's success spread across Europe, and Owain began to receive naval support from Scotland and Brittany. He also received the support of King Charles VI of France, who agreed to send French troops and supplies to aid the rebellion. In 1403 Glyndwr had amassed an army of 4,000 in his first division, and 12,000 soldiers in total. A Welsh army including a French contingent assimilated into forces mainly from Glamorgan and the Rhondda Valleys region commanded by Owain Glyndŵr, his senior general Rhys Gethin and Cadwgan, Lord of Glyn Rhondda, defeated a large English invasion force reputedly led by King Henry IV himself at the Battle of Stalling Down in Glamorgan.

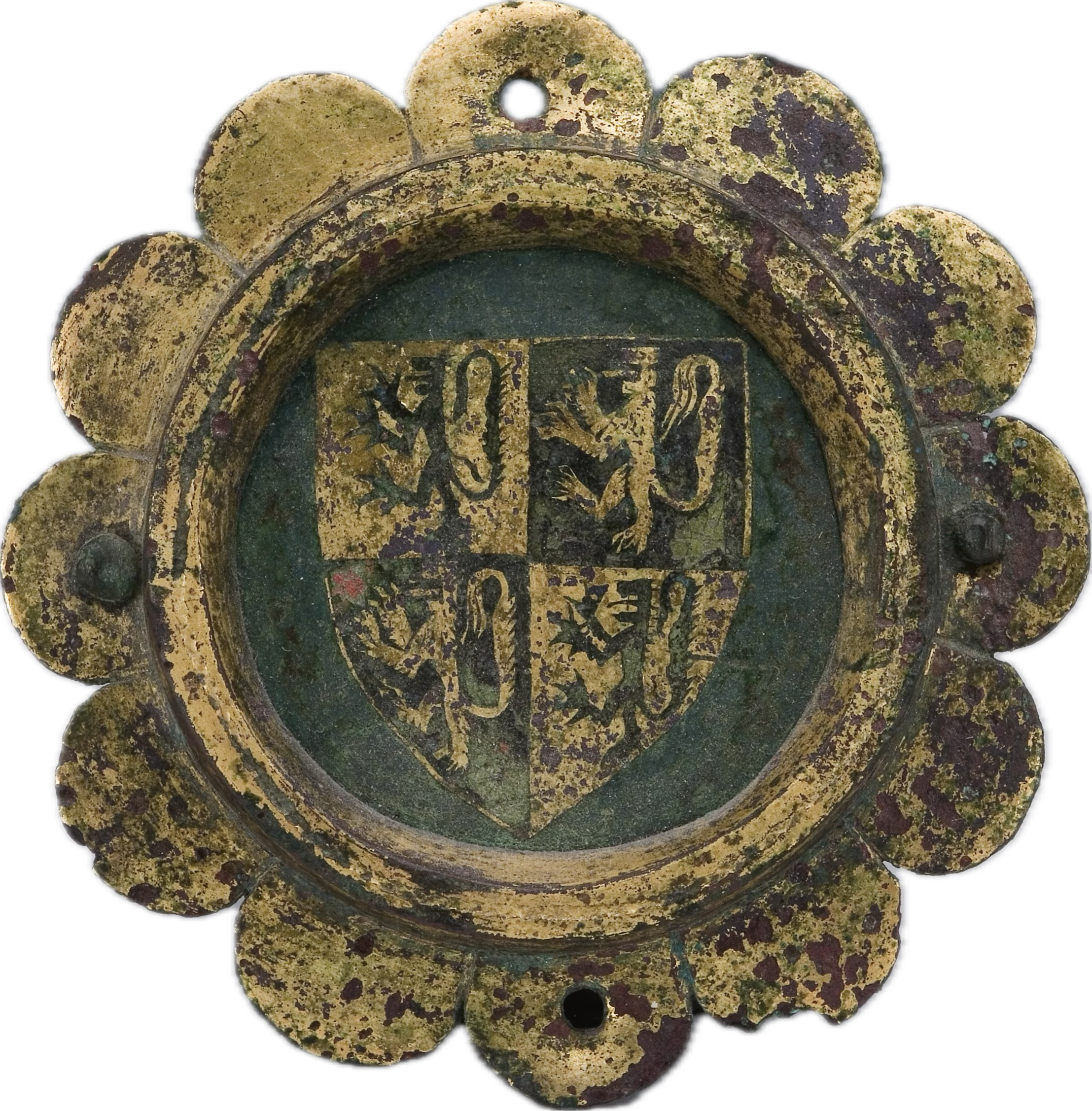
This mount from a sword belt or horse harness was found at Harlech Castle, which was taken by Owain in 1404.

Owain, facing years on the run, finally lost his estate in the spring of 1403, when Prince Henry as usual marched into Wales unopposed and burnt down Owain's houses at Sycharth and Glyndyfrdwy, as well as the commote of Edeirnion and parts of Powys. Owain continued to besiege towns and burn down castles; for 10 days in July that year, he toured the south and southwest of Wales until all of the south joined arms in rebelling against English rule. These actions induced an internal rebellion against the King of England, with the Percys joining the rising. It is around this stage of Owain's life that Hywel Sele, a cousin of the Welsh prince, attempted to assassinate Glyndŵr at the Nannau estate.

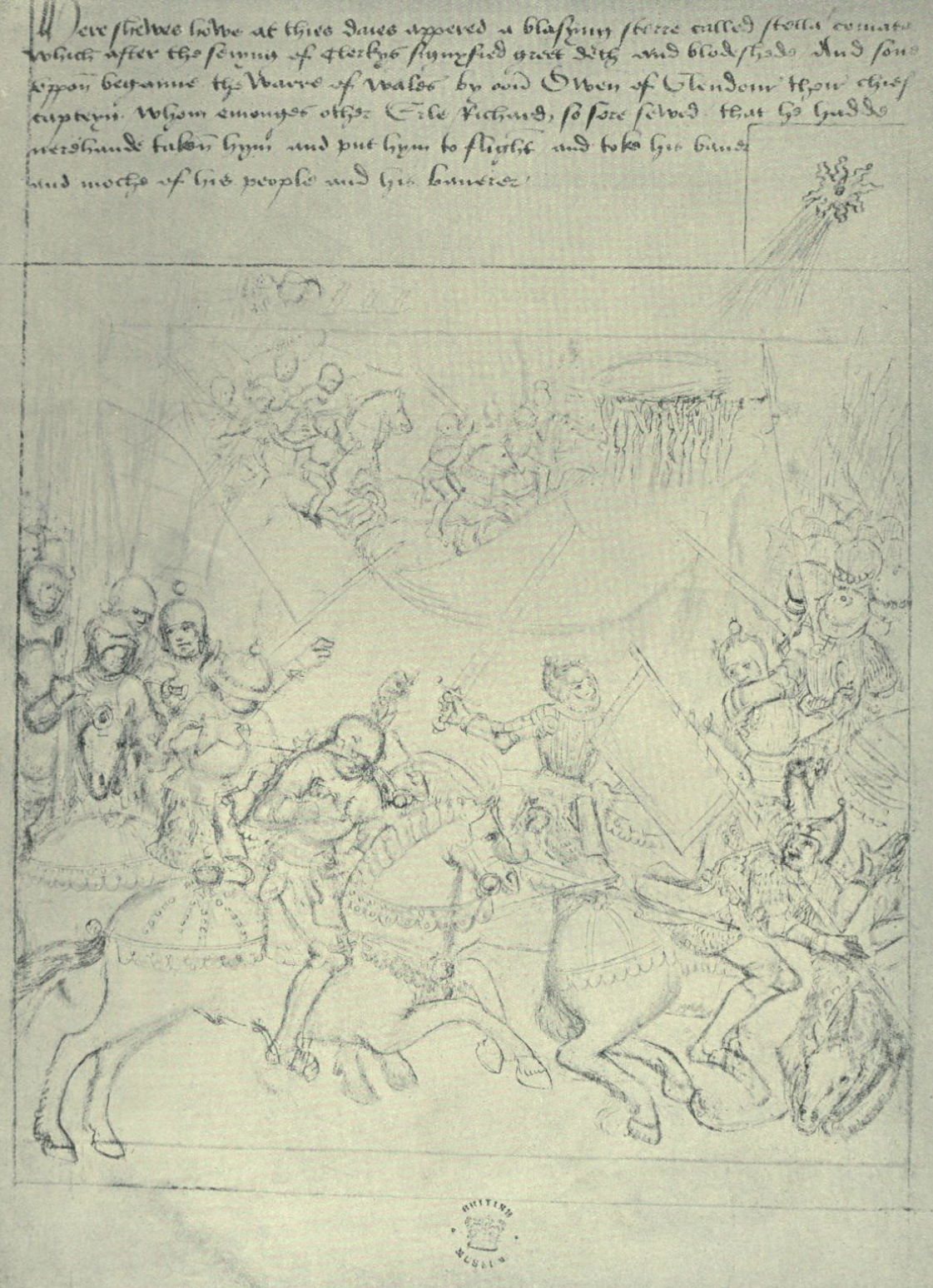
A late fifteenth-century depiction of the 1404 Battle of Campston Hill, a defeat for Owain's forces in Monmouthshire

In 1403, the revolt became truly national in Wales. Royal officials reported that Welsh students at Oxford and Cambridge Universities were leaving their studies to join Owain, and also that Welsh laborers and craftsmen were abandoning their employers in England and returning to Wales. Owain could also draw on Welsh troops seasoned by the English campaigns in France and Scotland. Hundreds of Welsh archers and experienced men-at-arms left the English service to join the rebellion.

In 1404, Owain's forces took Aberystwyth Castle and Harlech Castle, then continued to ravage the south by burning Cardiff Castle. Then, a court was held at Harlech and Gruffydd Young was appointed as the Welsh Chancellor. There had been communication to Louis I, Duke of Orléans in Paris to try (unsuccessfully) to open the Welsh ports to French trade.

== De facto rule of Wales, 1404 – 1405 ==
=== Parliament ===
By 1404, no less than four royal military expeditions into Wales had been repelled, and Owain had solidified his control of the nation. By this point, Owain and the rebellion had assumed de facto rule of Wales, and Owain was able to project himself to his French allies as a legitimate Prince of Wales. In 1404, he and his supporters held parliaments at Machynlleth and Harlech. He also planned to build two national universities (one in the south and one in the north), to re-introduce the traditional Welsh laws of Hywel Dda, and to establish an independent Welsh church. There were envoys from other countries including France, Scotland, and the Kingdom of León (in Spain). In the summer of 1405, four representatives from every commote in Wales were sent to Harlech.

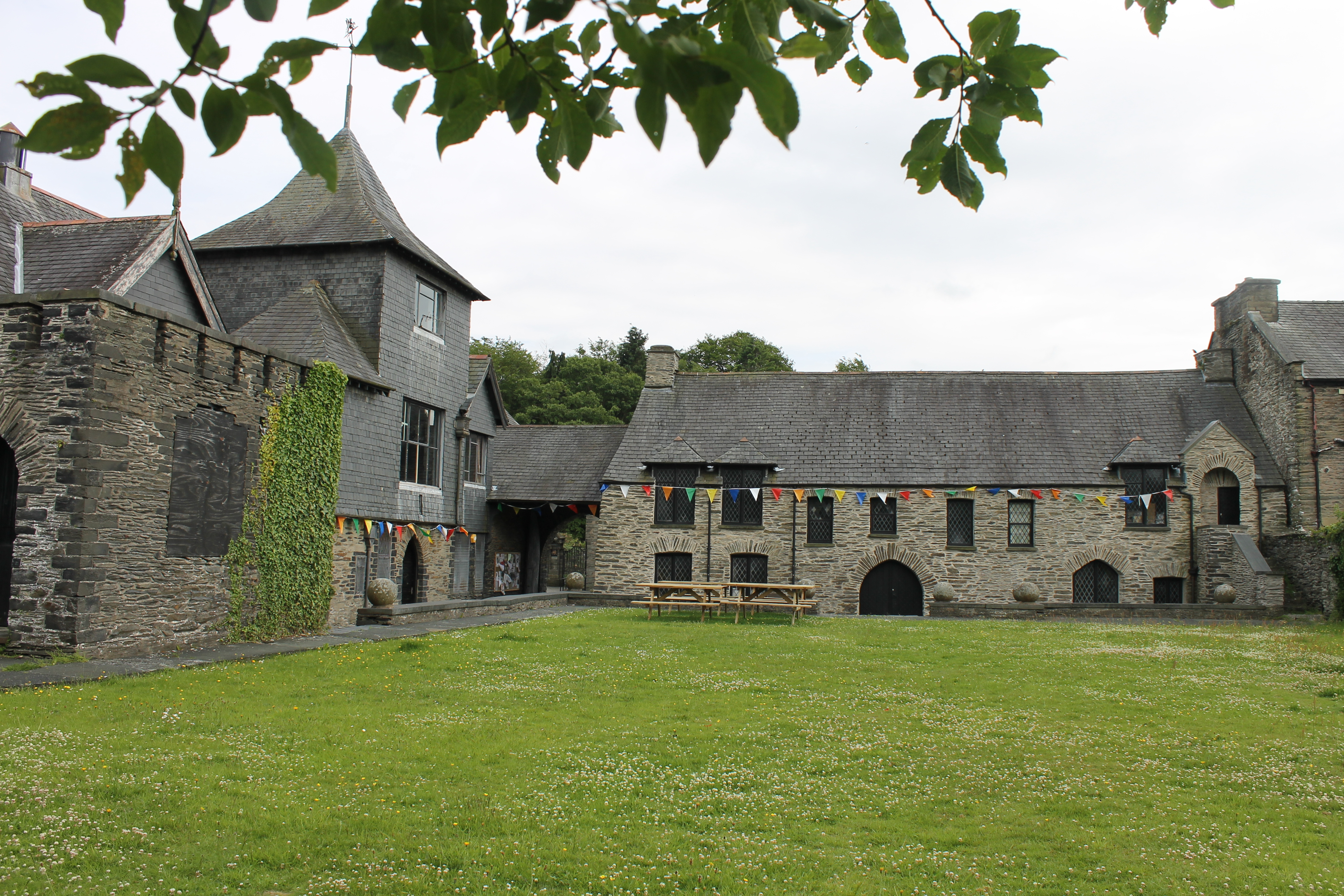
Rear of the Parliament House in Machynlleth

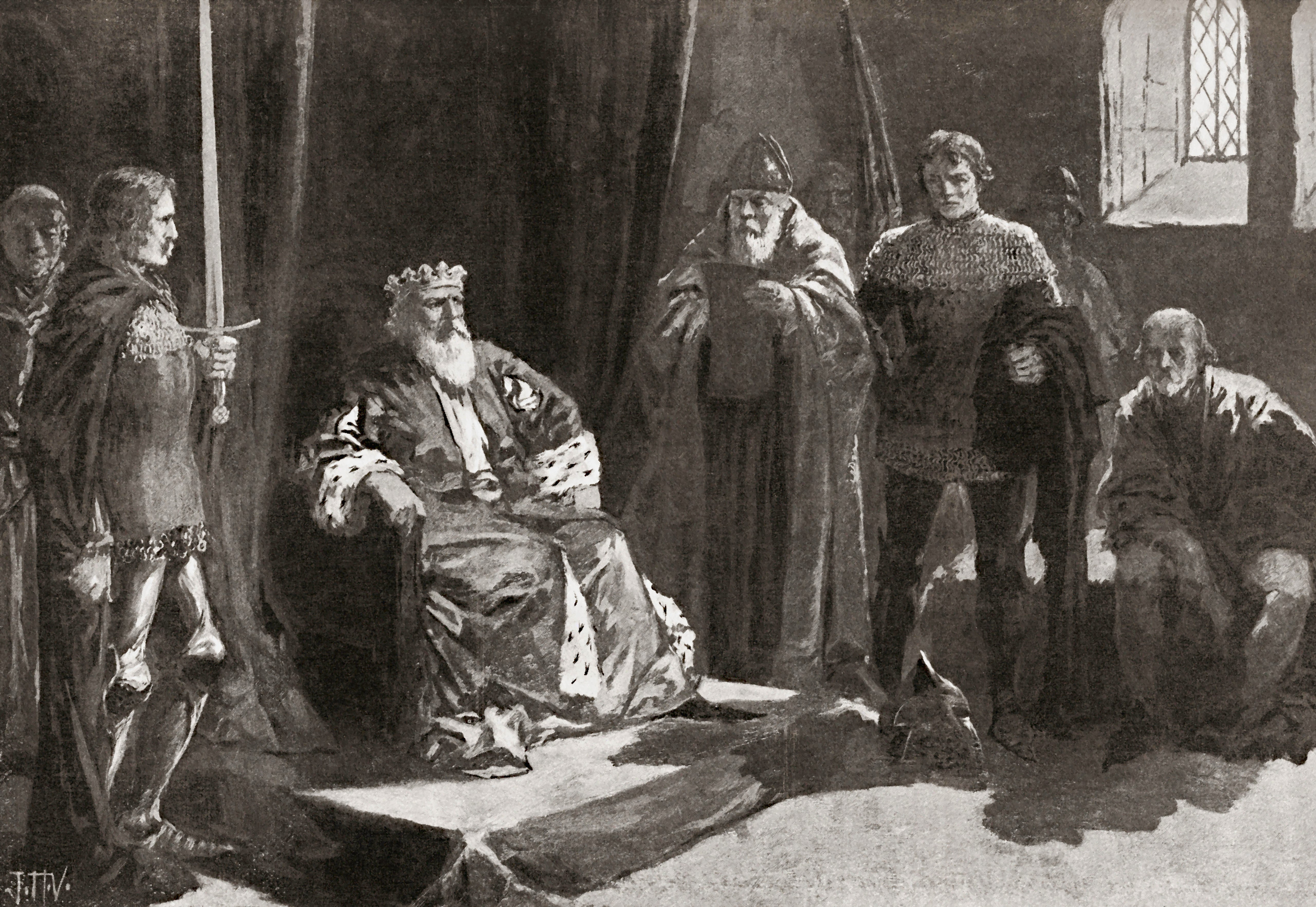
Owain Glyndŵr's Parliament at Machynlleth. (Note: (Illustration from Hutchinson's History of the Nations, 1915))

=== Tripartite indenture ===
In February 1405, Owain negotiated the Tripartite Indenture with Edmund Mortimer and Henry Percy, Earl of Northumberland. The Indenture agreed to divide England and Wales among the three of them. Wales would extend as far as the rivers Severn and Mersey, including most of Cheshire, Shropshire and Herefordshire. The Mortimer Lords of March would take all of southern and western England and the Percys would take the north of England. (Note: R. R. Davies noted that certain internal features underscore the roots of Owain's political philosophy in Welsh mythology: in it, the three men invoke prophecy, and the boundaries of Wales are defined according to Merlinic literature.) Although negotiations with the lords of Ireland were unsuccessful, Owain had reason to hope that the French and Bretons might be more welcoming. He dispatched Gruffudd Yonge and his brother-in-law John Hanmer (Margaret's brother) to negotiate with the French. The result was a formal treaty that promised French aid to Owain and the Welsh. The immediate effect seems to have been that joint Welsh and Franco-Breton forces attacked and laid siege to Kidwelly Castle. The Welsh could also count on semi-official fraternal aid from the Duchy of Brittany and from Scotland. Scots and French privateers were operating around Wales throughout Owain's war. Scottish ships had raided English settlements on the Llŷn Peninsula in 1400 and 1401. In 1403, a Breton squadron defeated the English in the Channel and devastated Jersey, Guernsey and Plymouth, while the French made a landing on the Isle of Wight. By 1404, they were raiding the coast of England, with Welsh troops on board, setting fire to Dartmouth and devastating the coast of Devon.

1405 was the "Year of the French" in Wales. A formal treaty between Wales and France was negotiated. On the continent, the French pressed the English as the French army invaded the English Plantagenet Aquitaine. Simultaneously, the French landed in force at Milford Haven in west Wales, burned Haverfordwest, and attempted to capture Pembroke Castle before they were bought off. The combined forces of French and Welsh took Carmarthen, which Owain had captured in 1403 but lost again. The occupants were given safe passage out, and they burned the town walls. Enguerrand de Monstrelet, a later chronicler gives an uncorroborated account of a march through Herefordshire and on into Worcestershire to Woodbury Hill, ten miles from Worcester. They met the English army and took positions from which they daily and viewed each other from a mile without any major action for eight days. Then, both sides seeming to find engagement too risky, departed.

=== Letter to Charles VI of France ===
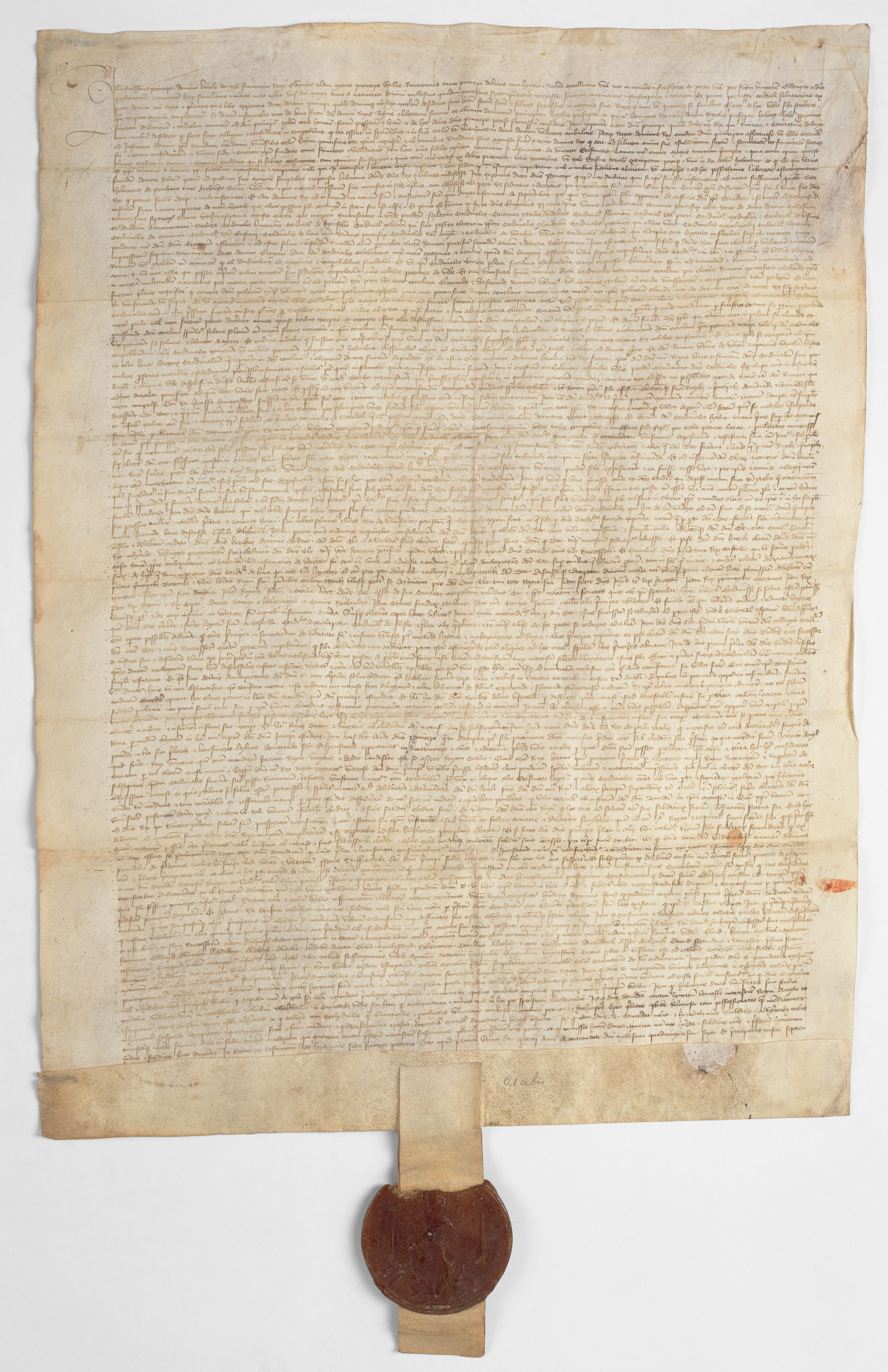
The Pennal Letter, held in the French Archives nationales

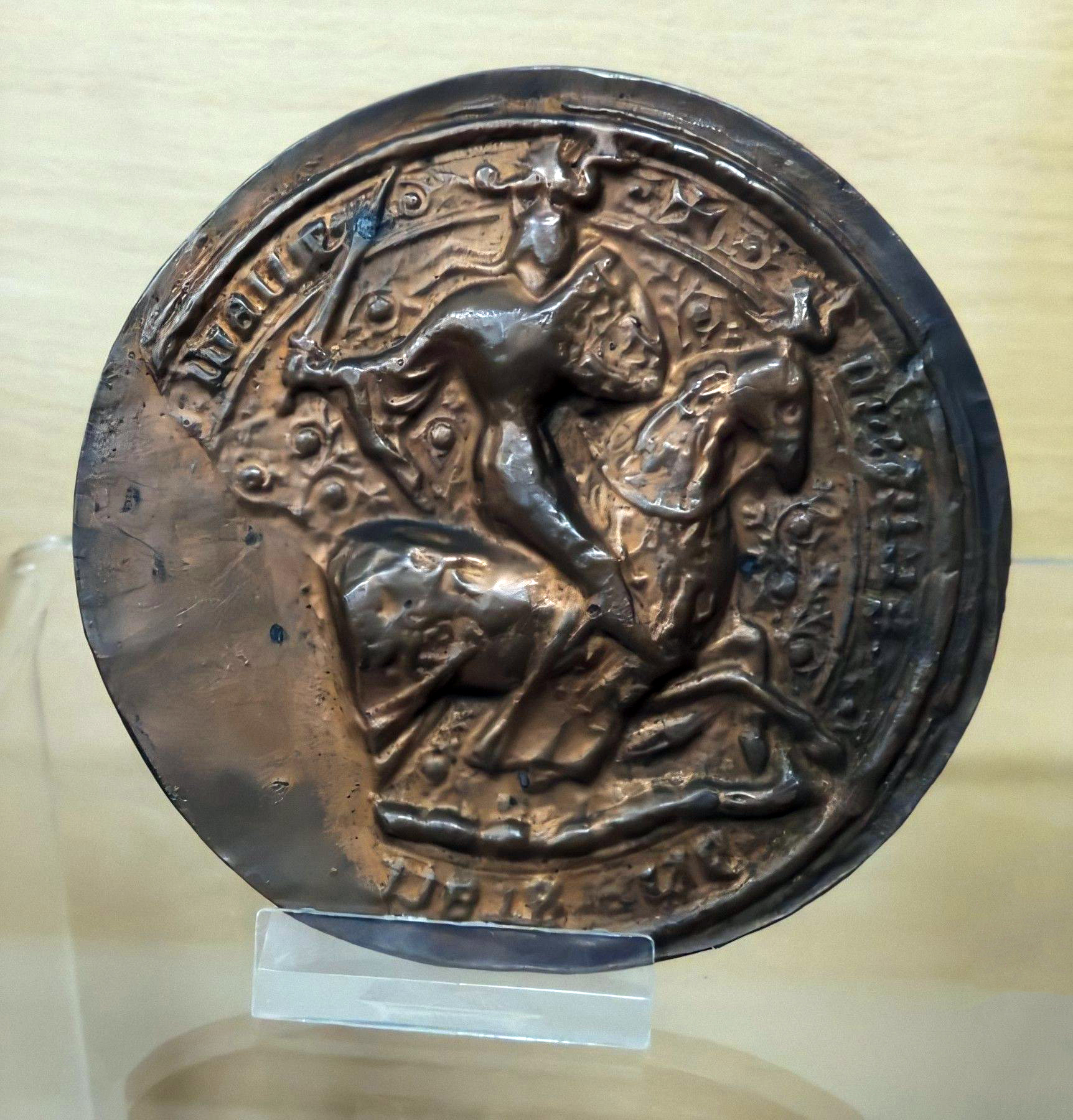
Owain Glyndŵr Great Seal impression (On horseback)

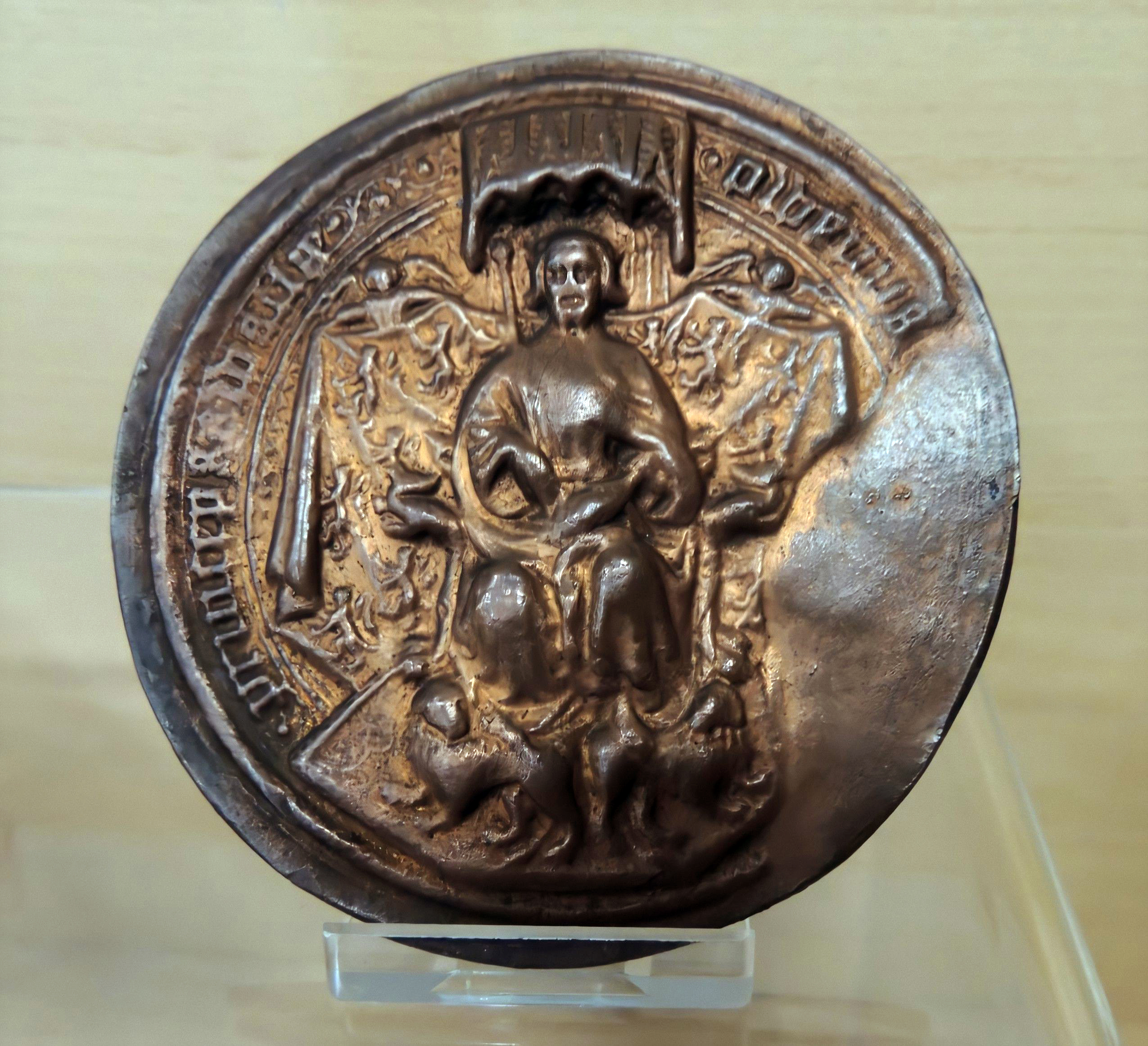
Glyndŵr's Great Seal impression (On throne)

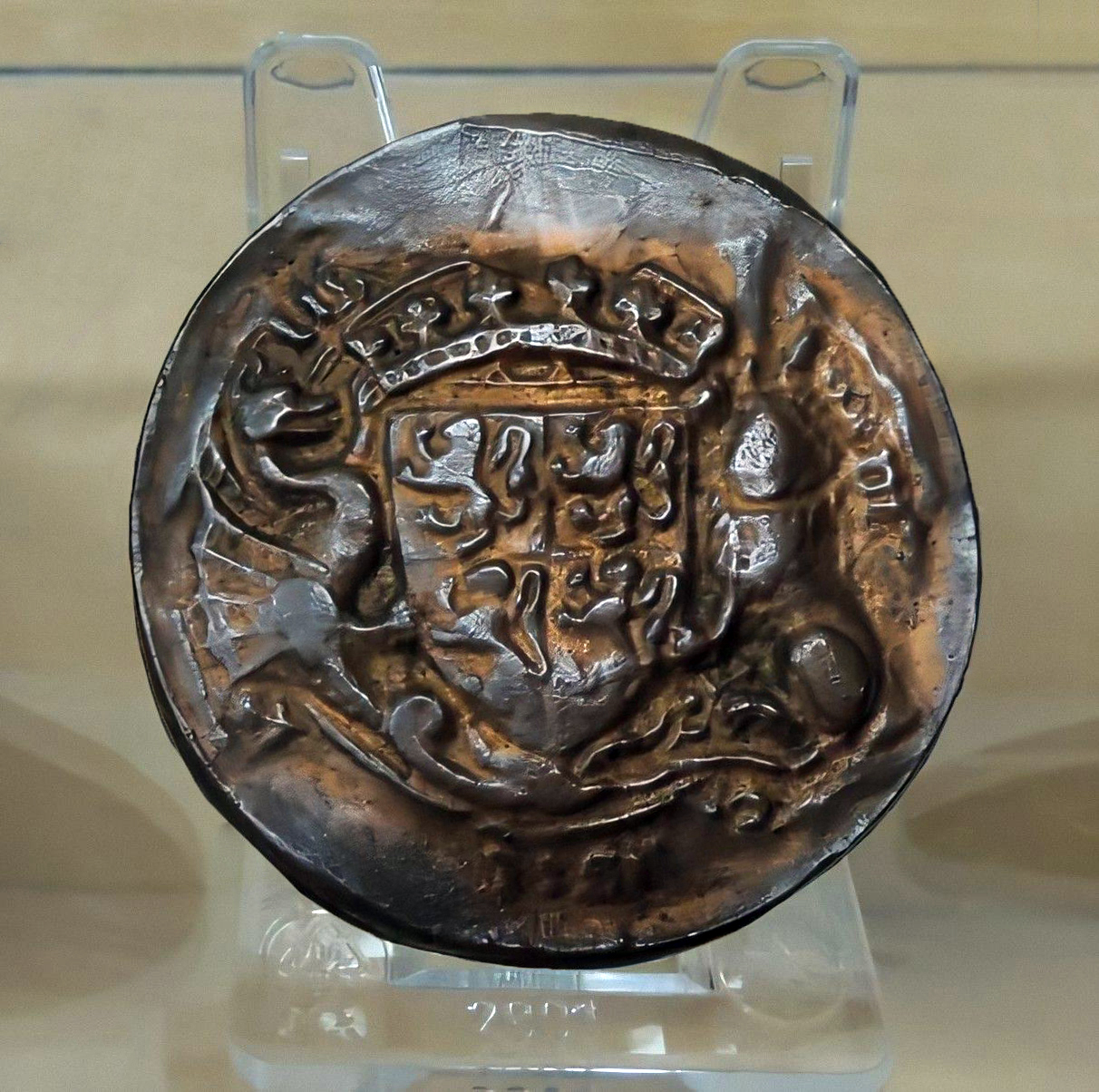
Owain Glyndŵr's Privy seal impression featuring a wyvern and forward facing lion, upright, yet seated (Coat of arms).

By 1405, most French forces had withdrawn after politics in Paris shifted towards peace, with the Hundred Years' War continuing between England and France. On 31 March 1406, in St Peter ad Vincula church at Pennal, Owain wrote a letter to be sent to Charles VI of France. Owain's letter requested to maintain military support from the French to fend off the English in Wales. Owain suggested that in return, he would recognise Benedict XIII of Avignon as the Pope. The letter sets out the ambitions of Owain for an independent Wales with its own parliament, led by himself as Prince of Wales. These ambitions also included the return of the traditional law of Hywel Dda, rather than the enforced English law, establishment of an independent Welsh church by expanding the Bishoporic of St. David's into England, well as two universities, one in south Wales, and one in north Wales. Following this letter, senior churchmen and important members of society flocked to Owain's banner and English resistance was reduced to a few isolated castles, walled towns, and fortified manor houses.

Owain's Great Seal and a letter handwritten by him to the French in 1406 are in the Bibliothèque nationale de France in Paris. This letter is currently held in the Archives Nationales in Paris. Facsimile copies involving specialist ageing techniques and moulds of Owain's seal were created by the National Library of Wales and presented by the heritage minister Alun Ffred Jones to six Welsh institutions in 2009. The royal great seal from 1404 was given to Charles IV of France and contains images and Owain's title –

Latin: Owynus Dei Gratia Princeps Walliae –
"Owain, by the grace of God, Prince of Wales".

Glyndwr referred to himself as the "Prince of Wales" and claimed his "right of inheritance" in these letters

== The faltering rebellion, 1405 – 1412 ==
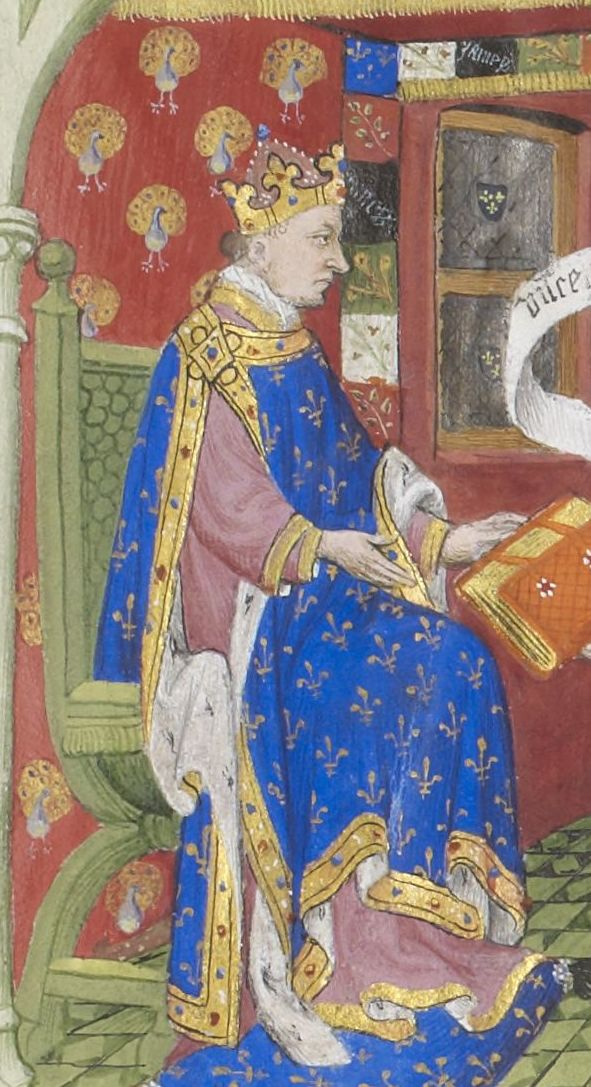
Charles VI of France did not continue to support Owain's revolt

In early 1405, the Welsh forces, who had until then won several easy victories, suffered a series of defeats. Owain's brother, Lord Tudur ap Gruffudd, a commander during the war, died at the Battle of Pwll Melyn in May 1405. English forces landed in Anglesey from Ireland and would over time push the Welsh back until the resistance in Anglesey formally ended toward the end of 1406.

Following the intervention of French forces, battling continued for years. In 1406 Prince Henry restored fines and redemption for Welsh soldiers so they could choose their own fate. Prisoners were taken after the battle and castles were restored to their original owners. In the same year a son of Owain died in battle. By 1408 Owain had taken refuge in the North of Wales, having lost his ally from Northumberland.

Despite the initial success of the revolution, in 1407 the superior numbers, resources, and wealth that England had at its disposal began to turn the tide of the war, and the much larger and better-equipped English forces gradually began to overwhelm the Welsh. In times of war, the English changed their strategy. Rather than focusing on punitive expeditions as favoured by his father, the young Prince Henry adopted a strategy of economic blockade. Using the castles that remained in English control, he gradually began to retake Wales while cutting off trade and the supply of weapons. By 1407, this strategy was beginning to bear fruit, and by 1408, the English regained Aberystwyth and then marched north Harlech Castle, which also surrendered during the cold winter into 1409. Edmund Mortimer died during the siege, and Owain's wife Margaret along with two of his daughters (including Catrin) and three of Mortimer's granddaughters were captured on the fall of the castle and imprisoned in the Tower of London. They were all to die in the Tower in 1413 and were buried at St Swithin, London Stone. Before his downfall, Owain was considered the wealthiest of all Welshmen.

Owain managed to escape capture by disguising himself as an elderly man, sneaking out of the castle and slipping past the English military blockade in the darkness of the night. Owain retreated to the Welsh wilderness with a band of loyal supporters; he refused to surrender and continued the war with guerrilla tactics such as launching sporadic raids and ambushes throughout Wales and the English borderlands.

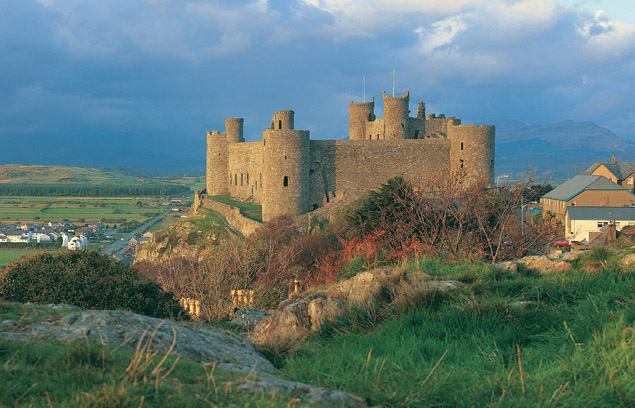
Harlech Castle

Owain remained free, but he had lost his ancestral home and was a hunted prince. He continued the rebellion, particularly wanting to avenge his wife. In 1410, Owain led a raid into rebel-controlled Shropshire, and in 1412, he carried out one of the final successful raids. With his most faithful soldiers, he cut through the King's men in an ambush in Brecon, where he captured, and later ransomed, a leading Welsh supporter of King Henry, Dafydd Gam ('Crooked David'). This was the last time that Owain was seen alive by his enemies, although it was claimed he took refuge with the Scudamore family. In the autumn, Owain's Aberystwyth Castle surrendered, while he was away fighting, but by then things were changing. Henry IV died in 1413, and his son Henry V began to adopt a more conciliatory attitude towards the Welsh. Royal pardons were offered to the major leaders of the revolt and other opponents of his father's regime. As late as 1414, there were rumours that the Herefordshire-based Lollard leader Sir John Oldcastle was communicating with Owain, and reinforcements were sent to the major castles in the north and south.

On 21 December 1411, the King of England issued pardons to all Welsh except their leader and Thomas of Trumpington (until 9 April 1413, from which Owain was no longer excepted). Owain ignored offers of a pardon on many different occasions, his followers continued to be punished for crimes of war until the 1410s. The poet Lewys Glyn Cothi wrote an elegy for Gwenllian, an illegitimate daughter of Owain, where it was mentioned that at the time of the Welsh War of independence, the whole of Wales was under Owain's command, with forty dukes as the prince's allies, and that later in life he supported 62 female pensioners.

== Disappearance and death, 1412 – c. 1416 ==
Owain was never captured and appears to have spent the last years of his life in hiding. In the sixteenth-century antiquarian Gruffudd Hiraethog's Annals of Owain Glyn Dŵr, it is recounted that in 1415 Owain "went into hiding on St Matthew's Day in Harvest [September 21]", but this date is discounted by J. E. Lloyd as a mere repetition of his first absconding to the woods after the beginning of his revolt, which occurred on the same day in 1400. In 1415 and 1416, Owain's old enemy Henry V attempted to entreat Owain and the few remaining rebels to surrender and be pardoned, to which Owain never responded; Owain is presumed to have died around this time.

=== Accounts from Herefordshire ===
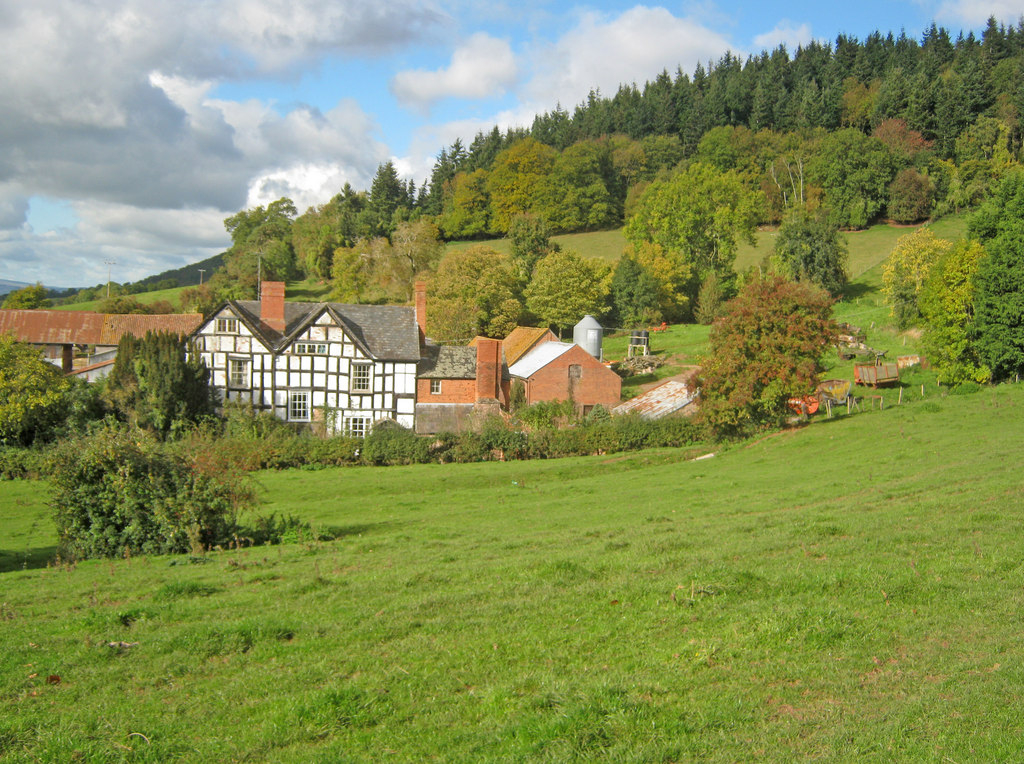
Lawton's Hope, a possible candidate for the place of Owain's death

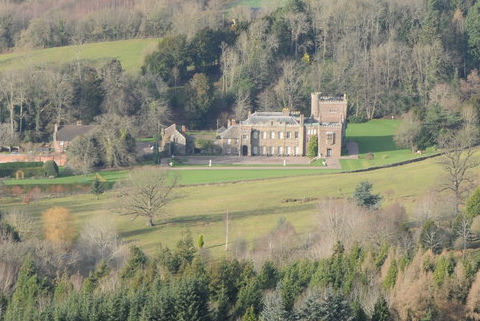
Kentchurch Court, another candidate

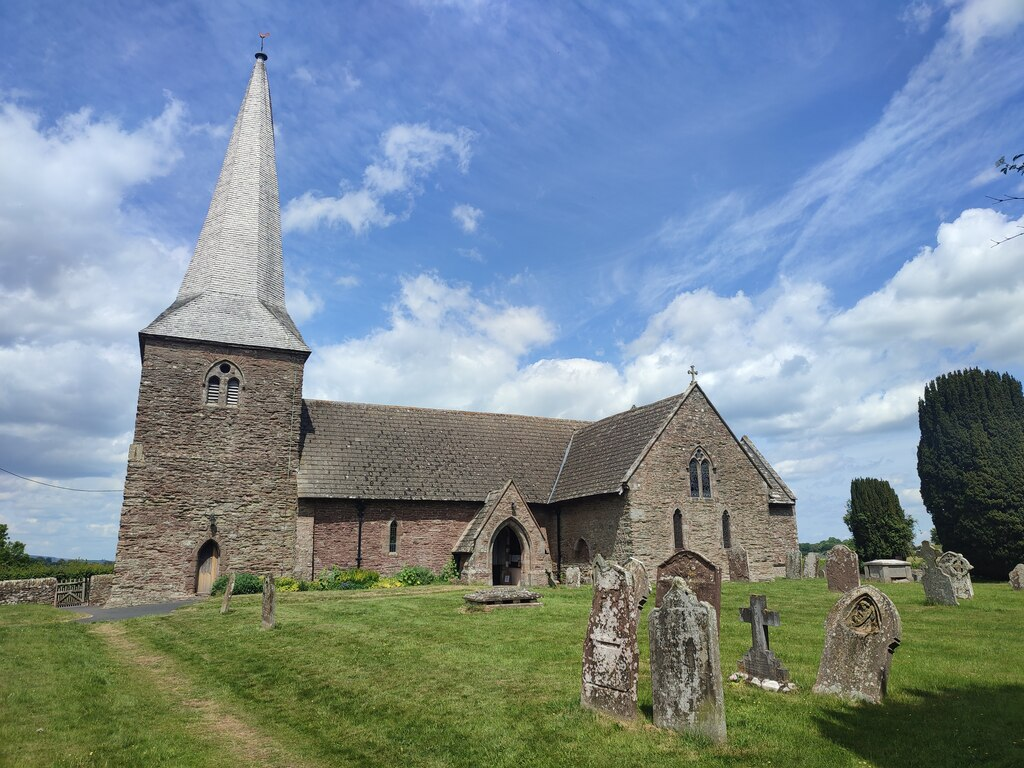
St James, Leominster, a candidate for Owain's burial-place

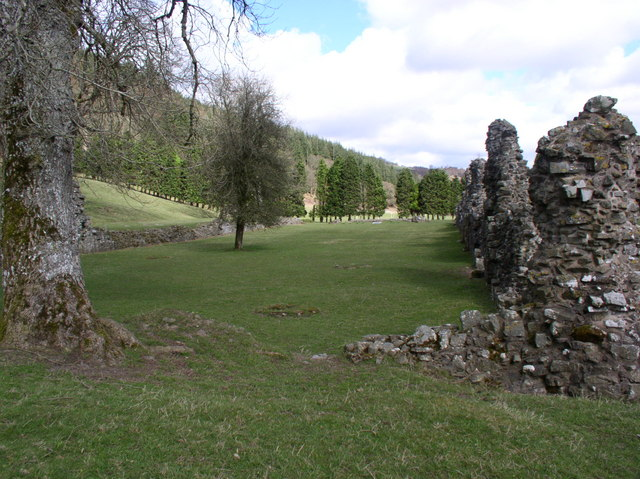
Abbey Cwmhir, perhaps Owain's final resting place

The uncertain circumstances surrounding Owain's final days gave rise to many legends surrounding his death. According to J. E. Lloyd and Gruffydd Aled Williams, the most credible sources associate Owain's death and burial with Herefordshire. The seventeenth-century History of Owen Glendower written by the antiquarians Robert Vaughan and Thomas Ellis notes that by their time "some say he dyed at his daughter Scudamores, others, at his daughter Monington's house". An early sixteenth-century translation of Tito Livio Frulovisi's Life of Henry the Fifth inserts into the text an assertion that Owain died "vppon the topp of Lawton's hope Hill in Herefordshire". Lawton's Hope farm near Canon Pyon was inherited by the Monnington family around the turn of the fourteenth century, and its owner around the time of Owain's death would have been Sir Richard Monnington, husband of Owain's daughter Sioned.

Other traditions associate the site of Owain's death with Kentchurch Court, owned by another one of Owain's sons-in-law, John Skydmore, though the better-attested hall of the family at this time was Bodenham at La Verne. In the early fifteenth century, the area around Kentchurch would have been majority Welsh-speaking, and Skydmore was the employed by the state as the Welsh interpreter for Gwidigada and Elfed in Carmarthenshire from the years 1411-1431. Another hall associated with this family is Monnington Straddle, which possessed a medieval chapel and was endorsed as Owain's place of rest by J. E. Lloyd. The final likely possibility for Owain's burial ground is at St James the Great, Kimbolton, which was formerly the chapelry of Leominster Priory and also owned by the Skydmores; this tradition is attributed to is attributed to the sixteenth-century scholar Edmund Prys, a Welshman who was vicar of nearby Ludlow from 1576 to 1579.

=== A second burial? ===
Owain may have been buried a second time, as according to Adam Usk, "After four years in hiding from the king and kingdom, Owen Glendower died, and was buried by his followers in the darkness of night. His grave was discovered by his enemies, however, so he had to be re-buried, though it is impossible to discover where he was laid." While Owain may have been reburied at some other location in Herefordshire, another possibility is outside of the county, even in Wales. The fifteenth-century poet Robin Ddu of Anglesey, writing in the tumultuous reign of Richard III, prophesied that "There is an old man in Maelienydd / whose hair is like blossom on trees... I have heard, captivating muse, / much poetry about an old white-haired man, / and if this one who will claim his right / is the prophesied white-haired one, / battle-axe and sword without delay / will extend the boundary of our land..." and in one line names this man as "Owain". In the fifteenth century, Lewys Glyn Cothi called the husband of Owain's daughter Gwenllïan who lived in the parish of St Harmon on the border between Gwrtheyrnion and Maelienydd "son-in-law to the Old White-haired One"; Lewys Glyn Cothi also associates Owain with Maelienydd in another poem. Thus, Gruffydd Aled Williams suggested the final resting place of Owain Glyndŵr may have been Cwmhir Abbey, which was located in Maelienydd and was also the final resting place of Llywelyn ap Gruffudd, the native Prince of Wales killed in the final stages of the Edwardian Conquest.

== Issue and descendants ==
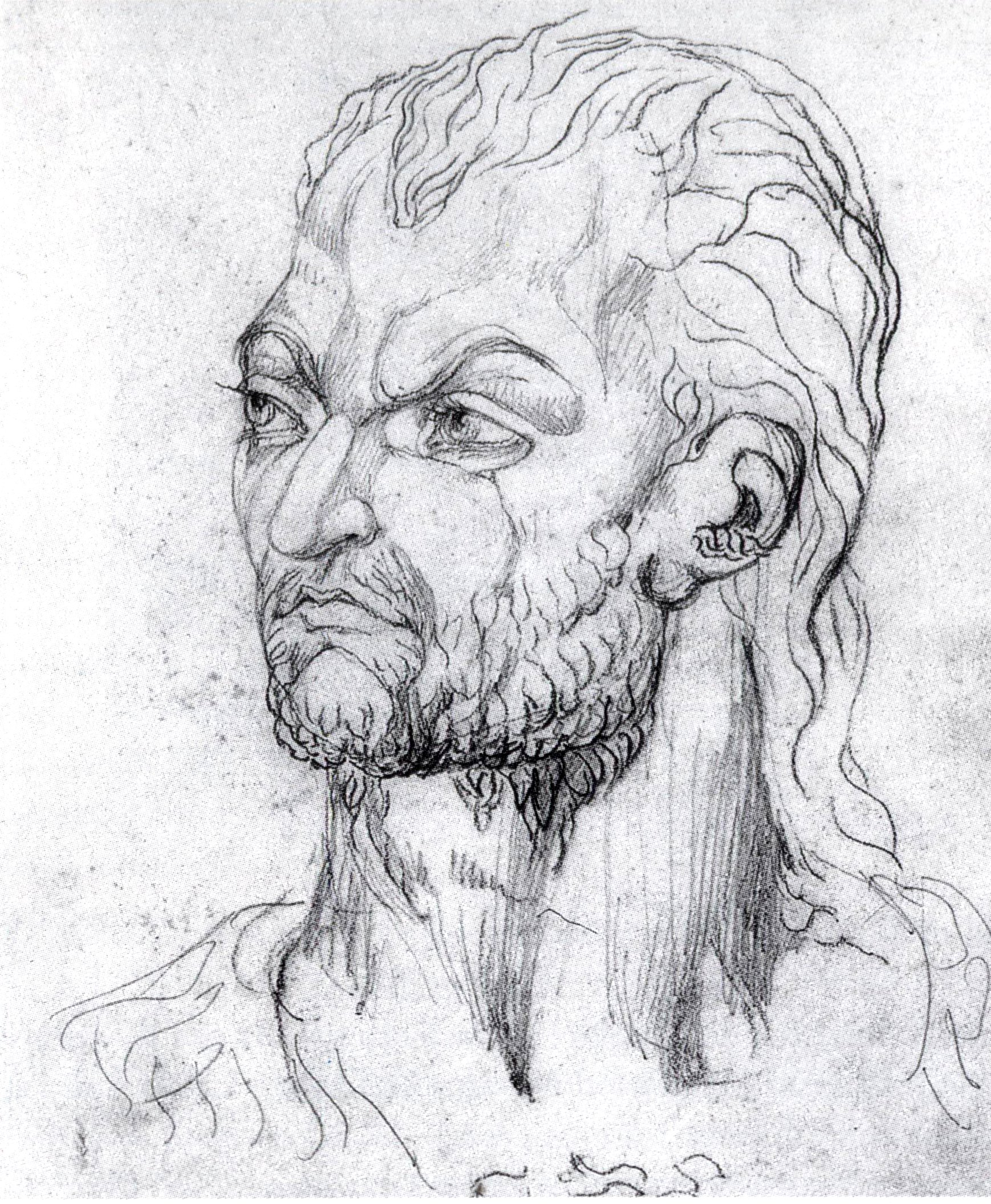
A sketch of Owain Glyndŵr as he appeared to William Blake in a late-night vision. This is one of a number of such sketches known collectively as the Visionary Heads.

Owain married Margaret Hanmer, also known by her Welsh name Marred ferch Dafydd, and together they had five or six sons and four or five daughters. Also, Owain had some illegitimate children out of wedlock.

=== Sons ===
- Gruffudd d. 1411.
- Madog.
- Maredudd alive in 1421.
- Thomas.
- John.

All of Owain and Margaret's sons from their marriage were either taken prisoner and died in confinement, or died in battle and had no issue. Gruffudd was captured in Gwent by Prince Henry, imprisoned in Nottingham Castle, and later taken to the Tower of London in 1410. Maredudd was recorded as communicating with John Talbot and the English Crown on 24 February 1416, and receiving a royal pardon in 1421, but dying a few years later.

=== Daughters ===
- Alice (Alys), m. John Scudamore of Ewyas.
- Jane.
- Janet, m. Sir John De Croft.
- Margaret, m. Sir Richard Monnington.
- Catherine (Catrin) (d. 1413), m. (1) Edmund Mortimer (d. 1409), (2) Roger Mortimer.

Upon Owain's disappearance and death, his eldest (oldest child with descendants) daughter Alice came to be known as the Lady of Glyndyfrdwy and Cynllaith, and heiress de jure of the Principalities of Powys, South Wales and Gwynedd. During 1431, she successfully went to court in Meirionydd to regain her inheritance as the heiress of Sycharth in Glyndyfrdwy against John, Earl of Somerset, who had been granted Owain's forfeited lands by the King of England in 1400. Alice's descendants married into the Scudamore family and her direct descendant John Lucy Scudamore married the daughter of Harford Jones-Brydges in the early 19th century, and whose daughter in 1852 married the son of Edward Lucas from the Castleshane estate in Ireland. Another daughter, Jane, married Henry, Lord Grey de Ruthin without issue. Then, Janet married into the noble family of Croft Castle in Herefordshire, whose descendants today are titled the Croft Baronets. Whilst Margaret married a knight from Monnington, also in Herefordshire.

=== Illegitimate ===
Owain's illegitimate children with other women included Ieuan, Myfanwy and Gwenllian, whilst it is debated whether his son David was born out of wedlock. Ieuan became Owain's only male descendant to have children. Like his other illegitimate kin, they remained in Wales and married locally into Welsh families. Gwenllian became the wife of Philip ab Rhys ab Cenarth, and died near St Harmon in Powys (Radnorshire).

== Legacy ==
In Welsh culture Owain acquired a mythical status alongside other medieval kings such as Cadwaladr, Cynon ap Clydno and King Arthur. He was perceived as a folk hero awaiting a call to return and liberate his people in the classic Welsh mythical role – Y Mab Darogan ('the foretold son'). The myth was that one day after a thousand years of servitude under English rule, a 'Son of Prophecy' would return the Welsh people as rulers of the island of Great Britain. Also, in Welsh folklore, the name Owain has been connected to a legend of the 'son of destiny'. His claim as the Prince of Wales was similar to that of another distant relative from the Gwynedd dynasty. It was another Owain, Lawgoch (Owain ap Thomas ap Rhodri) who proclaimed his patrimony a few decades earlier, when he attempted to regain his family stature with aid from the King of France in a Franco-Welsh alliance from the late 1360s, until his assassination in 1378.

=== Modern legacy ===
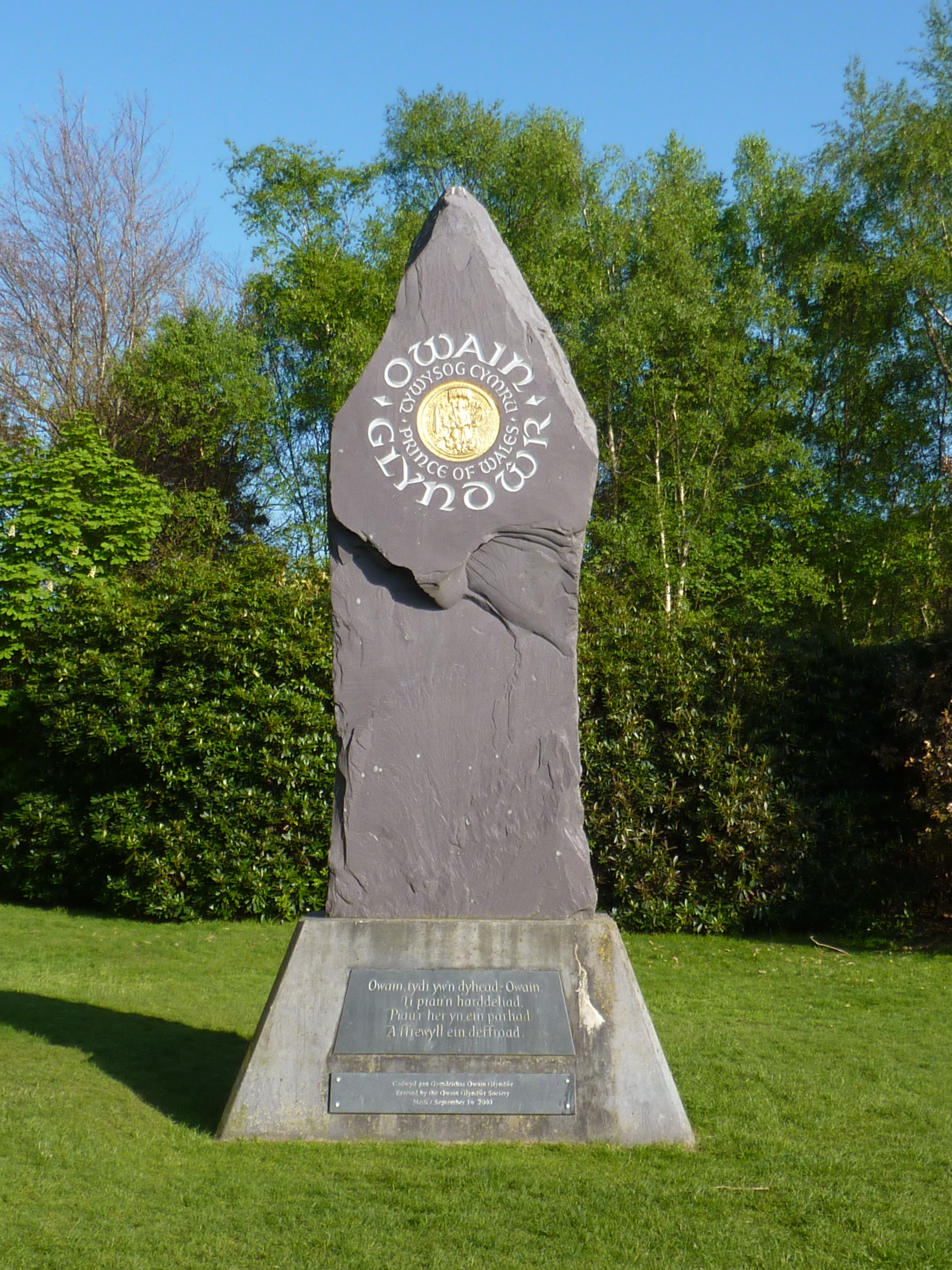
The Owain Glyndŵr Stone in Machynlleth

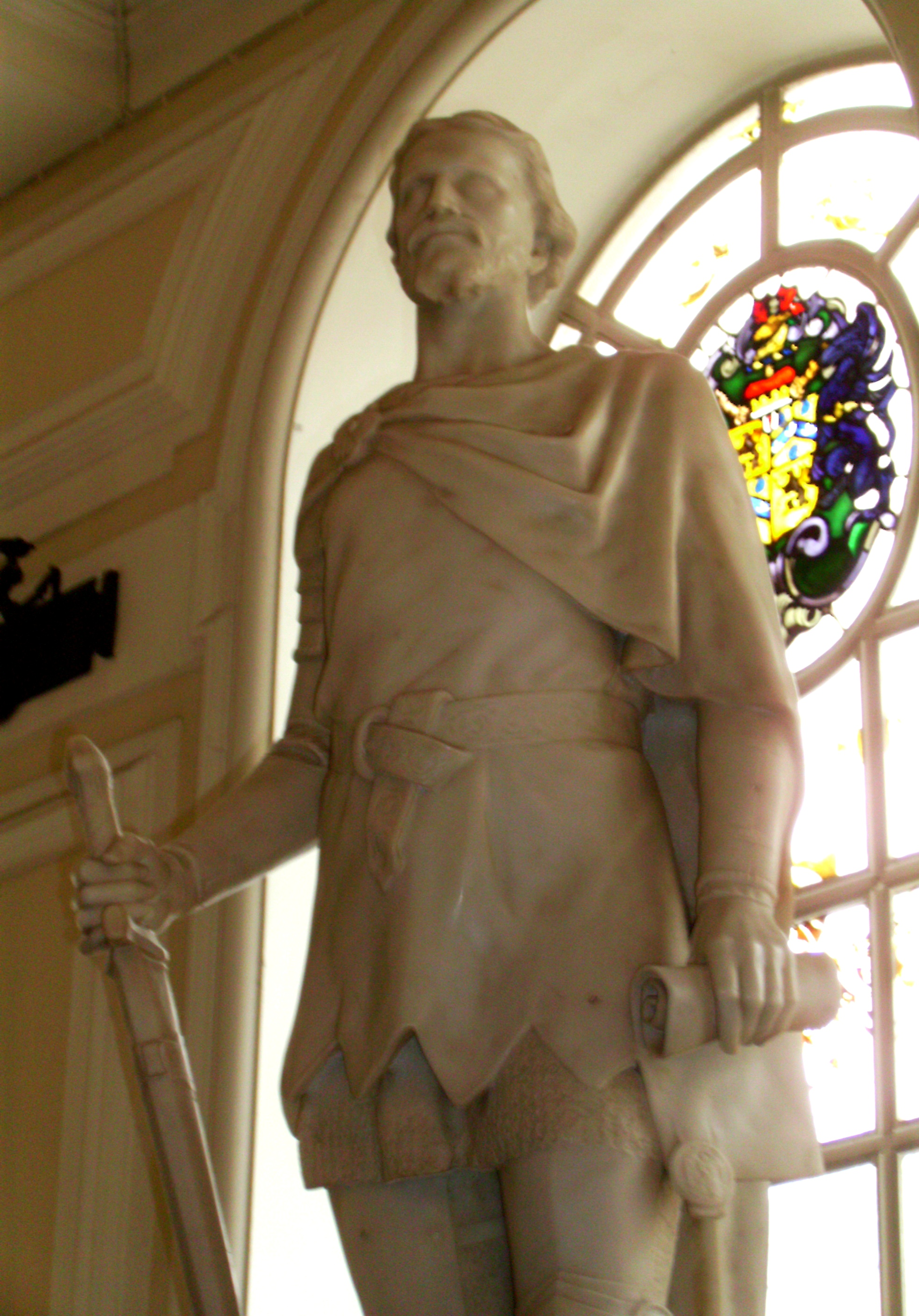
Statue of Glyndŵr at Cardiff City Hall

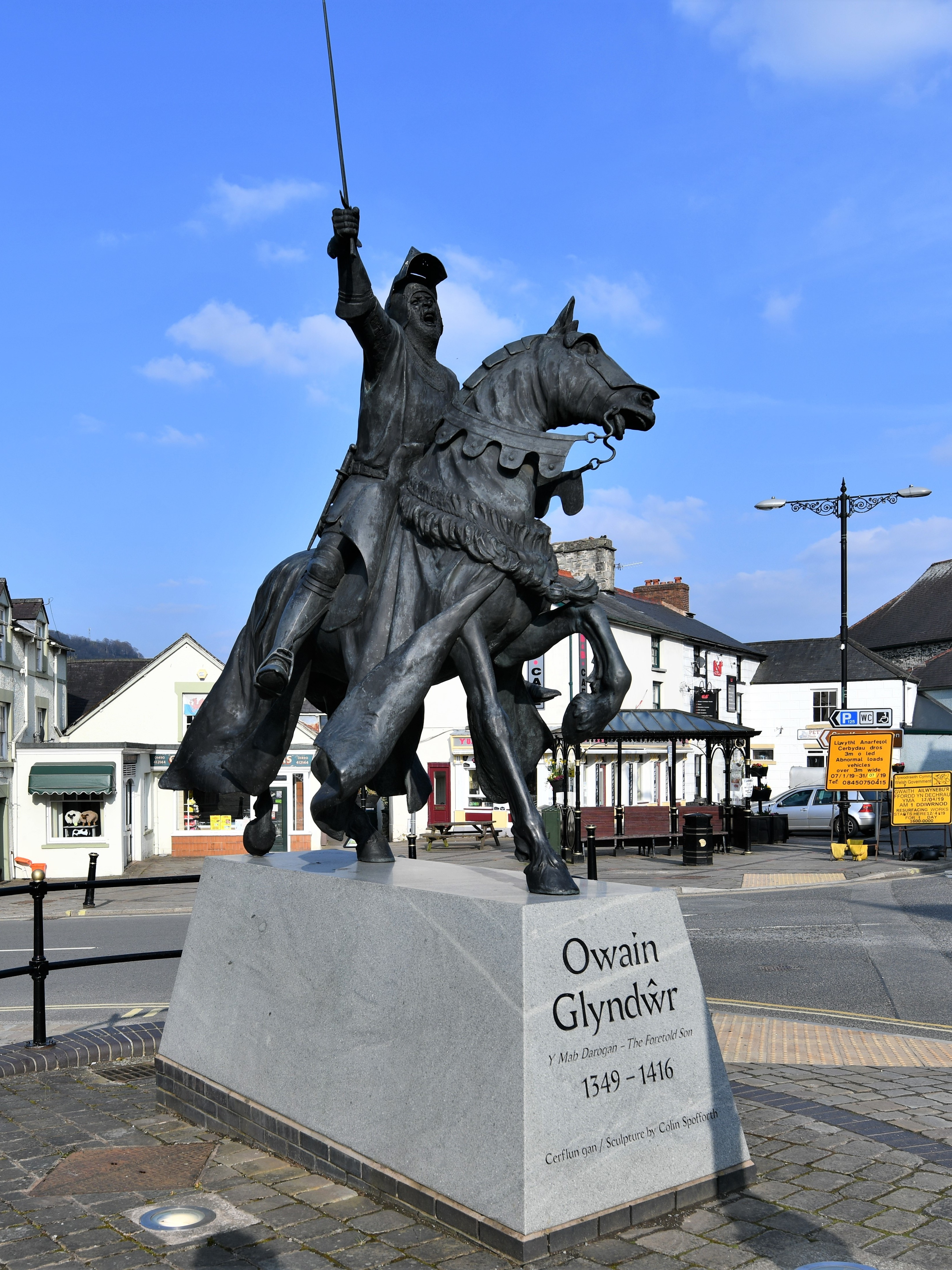
Equestrian statue in Corwen

- Owain was described by Fidel Castro as the first effective guerrilla leader. It has been suggested that Castro, who may have kept books about the Welshman, and Che Guevara copied some of Owain's methods in the Cuban Revolution.
- During the First World War, the prime minister David Lloyd George unveiled a statue to Owain in Cardiff City Hall. A statue of Owain by the sculptor Simon van de Put was installed in The Square in Corwen in 1995, and in 2007 it was replaced with a larger equestrian statue by Colin Spofforth.
- Owain came second to Aneurin Bevan in the 100 Welsh Heroes poll of 2003/2004. Stamps were issued with his likeness in 1974 and 2008, and streets, parks, and public squares were named after him throughout Wales. There is a campaign to make 16 September (Owain Glyndŵr Day), the date Owain raised his standard, a public holiday in Wales, including by Dafydd Wigley in 2021.
- RGC 1404 (Rygbi Gogledd Cymru, 'north Wales rugby') rugby union team is named in honour of "the year Owain Glyndŵr became Prince of Wales".
- To celebrate the 600th anniversary of Owain's life, a monument was erected in Machynlleth in the grounds of Plas Machynlleth.

==== Meibion Glyndŵr ====
Owain is now remembered as a national hero and numerous small groups have adopted his symbolism to advocate independence for Wales or Welsh nationalism. For example, during the 1980s, a group calling itself Meibion Glyndŵr ("the Sons of Glyndŵr") claimed responsibility for the burning of English holiday homes in Wales.

=== Literature ===
- After Owain's death, there was little resistance to English rule. The Tudor dynasty saw Welshmen become more prominent in English society. In Henry IV, Part 1, Shakespeare portrays him as Owen Glendower (the name has since been adopted as the anglicised version of Owain Glyndŵr), wild and exotic; a man who claims to be able to "call spirits from the vasty deep", ruled by magic and tradition in sharp contrast to the more logical but highly emotional Hotspur. Glendower is further noted as being "not in the roll of common men" and "a worthy gentleman,/Exceedingly well read, and profited/ In strange concealments, valiant as a lion/And as wondrous affable and as bountiful/As mines of India." His enemies describe him "that damn'd magician", which was in reference to having the weather on his side in battle.
- It was not until the late 19th century that Owain's reputation was revived, when the Cymru Fydd ('young Wales') movement recreated Owain as the father of Welsh nationalism.
- Owain later acquired mythical status as the hero awaiting a call to return and liberate his people. Thomas Pennant, in his Tours in Wales (1778, 1781 and 1783), searched out and published many of the legends and places associated with the memory of Owain.
- Owain has been featured in a number of works of modern fiction, including most notably John Cowper Powys's novel Owen Glendower (1941), and Edith Pargeter's 1972 publication A Bloody Field by Shrewsbury.
- A highly fictionalised Owain is featured in the popular YA book series The Raven Cycle by Maggie Stiefvater as Owen Glendower. In the series, which takes place in the Shenandoah Valley, characters believe that Owain's body was brought from Wales to Virginia after his death, and that whoever can "wake" him will be granted a favour.
- From 5 to 28 November 2026 a new play by Gary Owen called Owain & Henry, about Owain's rebellion against the rule of Henry IV of England in the 15th century, was performed at the Welsh National Theatre with Michael Sheen playing Owain. Sheen said "He meant absolutely nothing. I was never taught about him ... I knew nothing about his story. I was never taught Welsh history. It wasn't on the curriculum ... that tells you something... We're talking about a figure voted the second most important Welsh person of all time, only behind Aneurin Bevan [the architect of the NHS, but nobody's ever done anything about him on this scale before. That tells a story in itself."

=== Namesakes ===
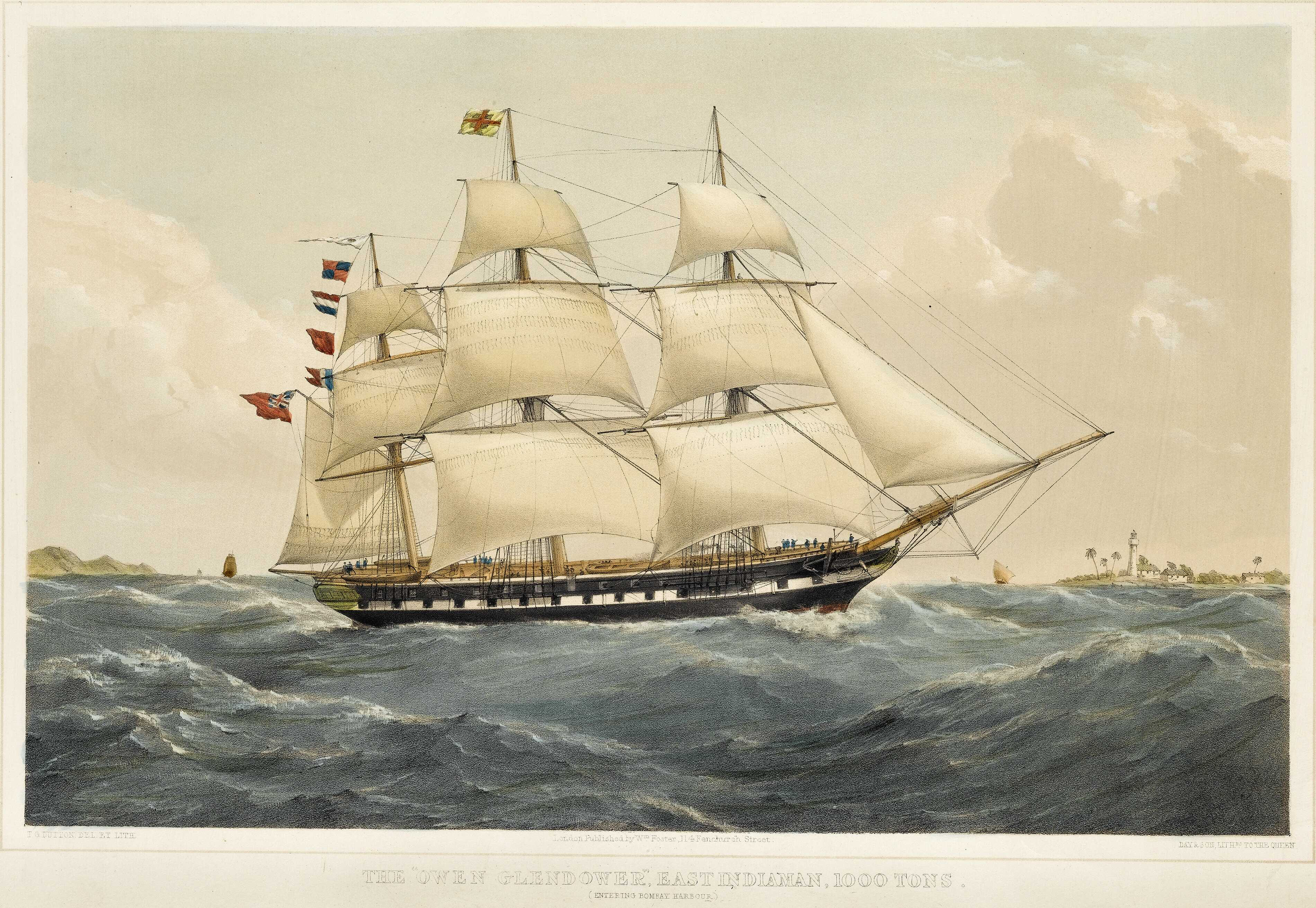
"Owen Glendower", East Indiaman, entering Bombay Harbour

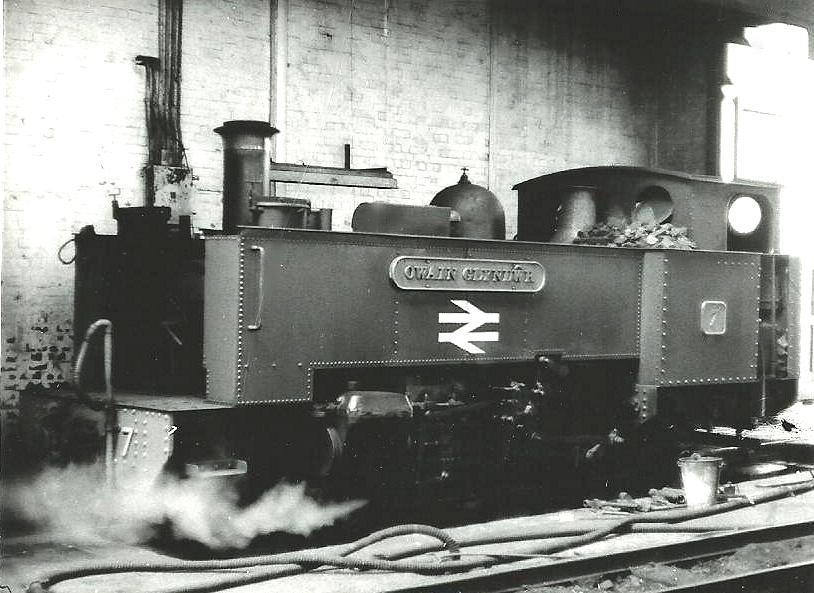
VoR 2-6-2T No.7 "Owain Glyndwr", built at GWR Swindon Works 1923

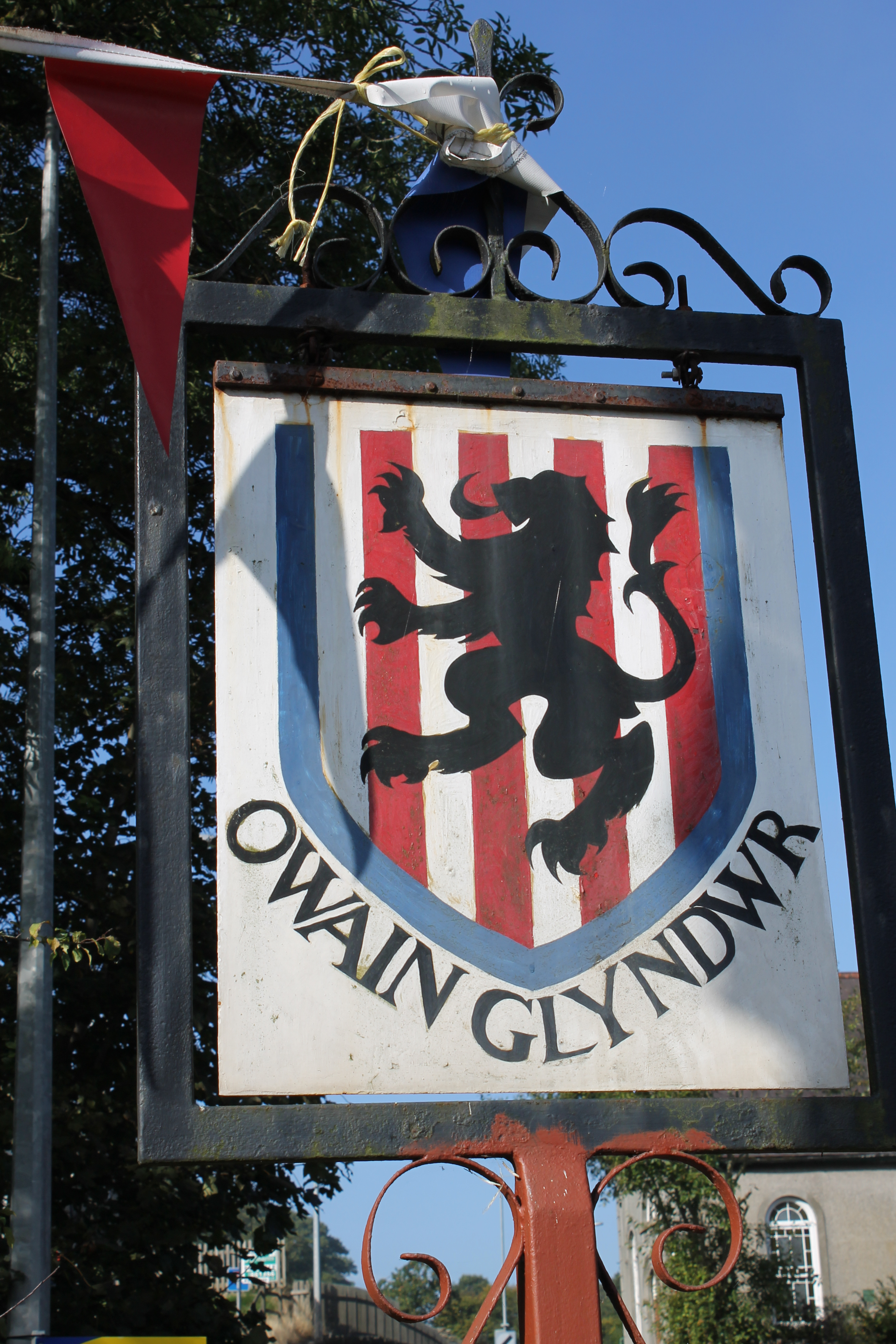
Owain Glyndŵr arms used as a hotel sign.

- The Owain Glyndwr Hotel in Corwen is a historic 18th century coaching inn.
- The Owain Glyndŵr pub in Cardiff, briefly named Owen Glendower was named in his honour.
- The waymarked, 132-mile long-distance footpath Glyndŵr's Way runs through Mid Wales near to his homelands.
- At least two ships and two locomotives have been named after Owain:
  - In 1808, the Royal Navy launched a 36-gun fifth-rate frigate,HMS Owen Glendower. She served in the Baltic Sea during the Gunboat War where she participated in the seizure of Anholt Island, and then in the Channel. Between 1822 and 1824, she served in the West Africa Squadron (or "Preventative Squadron") chasing down slave ships, capturing at least two;
  - Owen Glendower, an East Indiaman, a Blackwall frigate built in 1839;
  - In 1923, a 2-6-2T Vale of Rheidol locomotive was named after Owain. The locomotive is still operational and was one of a few used by British Rail until it was privatised;
  - 70010 Owen Glendower, renamed Owain Glyndŵr, built in 1951 at the Crewe Works, it was withdrawn in June 1965. It was a British Railways Standard Class 7 mixed-traffic steam locomotive.
- In 2002, a plaque was unveiled near the Tower of London to commemorate Glyndwr's daughter Catrin who died there with her children.
- From 2008 to 2023, Wrexham University was known as (Wrexham) Glyndŵr University in his honour. Despite dropping the name in 2023, the university maintains links with the Owain Glyndŵr Society for one of its annual graduate awards.

== Arms ==
Coat of arms of Owain Glyndŵr
Notes Owain's arms may represent those of the southern branch of the old dynasty of Powys quartered with his mother's arms as co-heiress of her father of the old dynasty of Deheubarth. This would create arms identical to those of Gwynedd and of Owain Lawgoch, the last pretender to the title of Prince of Wales. However, Owain Glyndŵr was of the northern branch of the dynasty of Powys which bore different arms than that of the southern branch and so he may have simply adopted Owain Lawgoch's arms in order to claim continuation with his pretension. These arms differ from those of the last pre-Conquest princes of Gwynedd, who bore arms with lions passant or passant gardant rather than rampant as here. Adopted Attested on seals of 10 May 1404 and 22 January 1405. Crest A winged two-legged dragon [Or ?]. Escutcheon Quarterly [Or] and [Gules], four lions rampant [counter-changed]. (Note: Owain's personal coats of arms before his rebellion are unknown. A late sixteenth-century armorial ascribes to Owain a garbled version of coat of the arms attributed to the founder of their line, Gruffudd Maelor, namely [Paly] Argent and Gules, a lion rampant Sable, armed Gules. However, the fifteenth-century scholar Gutun Owain asserts that Owain's brother Tudur bore the arms ascribed to Gruffudd Maelor's father, the king of Powys Madog ap Maredudd, namely Per pale Argent and Gules, a lion rampant Sable, armed Gules.) Supporters Dexter: A similar dragon; Sinister: A lion rampant gardant, crowned. Banner A modern reconstruction of the standard raised by Glyndŵr while besieging Caernarfon in 1401 based on its contemporary description by Adam of Usk. (Note: uixillum suum album cum dracone aureo ibidem displicuit "[Owain] raised his standard, a golden dragon on a white field".)

== Ancestry ==
Ancestors of Owain Glyndŵr

16. Gruffudd Fychan
8. Madog Crupl ap Gruffudd Fychan
17. Margaret ferch Rhys Ieunac
4. Gruffudd Llwyd of Rhuddallt
18. Ithel Fychan ap Ithel Llwyd of Helygain
9. Gwenllian ferch Ithel Fychan
19. Margaret Brickill
2. Gruffudd Fychan ap Gruffudd Llwyd
20. John IV Lestrange
10. John V Lestrange of Knockin
21. Joan de Somery
5. Elizabeth Lestrange
22. Ebal II de Mont
11. Eleanor de Mont
23. Elizabeth de Clinton
1. Owain Glyndŵr
24. Owain ap Maredudd
12. Llywelyn ab Owain
25. Angharad ferch Owain
6. Tomas ap Llywelyn
3. Elen ferch Thomas
28. Owain ap Maredudd
14. Maredudd ab Owain
7. Elinor ferch Maredudd
30. Llywelyn ab Owain
15. Lleucu ferch Llywelyn

== See also ==
- Owain Glyndŵr Day
- Owain Glyndŵr's Court
- Glyndŵr Award
- Buildings associated with Owain Glyndŵr
- Welsh rebellions against English rule
- Welsh heraldry
- Welsh Seal

== Bibliography ==
- Arron, Jane (5 June 2013). "'A Nation Once Again': Owain Glyndŵr and the 'Cymraec Dream' of Anglophone Welsh Victorian Poets". walesartreview.org.
- Allday, D. Helen (1981). Insurrection in Wales: the rebellion of the Welsh led by Owen Glyn Dwr (Glendower) against the English Crown in 1400. Lavenham: Terence Dalton. p. 51. ISBN 0-86138-001-0.
- Bartrum, P. C., ed. (1974). Welsh Genealogies: AD 300-1400. Cardiff: University of Wales Press. ISBN 070830561X. Archived from the original on 6 June 2023.
- Bliss, W. H.; Twemlow, J. A., eds. (1904). Calendar of Entries in the Papal Registers Relating to Great Britain and Ireland: Papal Letters. Vol. 5, 1398–1404. London: HM Stationery Office – via British History Online.
- "New Owain Glyndwr stamp unveiled". BBC News. 29 February 2008.
- "North Wales summon Owain Glyndwr's spirit in revamp". bbc.co.uk. 6 January 2010.
- Bentley, G. E. (27 February 2002). "Blake's Visionary Heads: Lost Drawings and a Lost Book". In Fulford, T. (ed.). Romanticism and Millenarianism. Palgrave Macmillan US. pp. 183–205. ISBN 978-0-312-24011-0.
- Bradley, A.G. (1901). Owen Glyndwr and the Last Struggle for Welsh Independence. G. P. Putnam's Sons.
- Brooke, Nick (17 April 2018). Terrorism and Nationalism in the United Kingdom: The Absence of Noise. Springer. ISBN 978-3-319-76541-9.
- Brough, Gideon (2017). The Rise and Fall of Owain Glyn Dwr: England, France and the Welsh Rebellion in the Late Middle Ages. I. B. Tauris. ISBN 978-1784535933.
- Burke, Steven (April 2011). Humphreys, Cathy (ed.). "The Reality of Travelling the African Coast: Midshipman Binstead on chasing". New Histories. 2 (6).
- "Full Report for Listed Buildings". cadwpublic-api.azurewebsites.net. Cadw, Welsh Government.
- Carr, A.D. (1995). "Rebellion and Revenge". Medieval Wales, British History in Perspective, Chapter 46: Rebellion and Revenge. Palgrave, London. pp. 108–132. doi:10.1007/978-1-349-23973-3_6. ISBN 9781349239733.
- Chapman, Adam (2015). Welsh soldiers in the Later Middle Ages. Woodbridge: The Boydell Press. ISBN 978-1783270316.
- Carr, A. D. (1963–1964). "The Barons of Edeyrnion, 1282–1485". Journal of the Merioneth Historical and Record Society. 4. Dolgellau: Merioneth Historical and Record Society: 187–193, 289–301.
- —— (1964). "Medieval Dinmael". Transactions of the Denbighshire Historical Society. 13. Ruthin: Denbighshire Historical Society: 9–21.
- —— (1968). "Welshmen and the Hundred Years' War". Welsh History Review. 4. Cardiff: University of Wales Press: 21–46 – via The National Library of Wales.
- —— (1970). "An Aristocracy in Decline: the Native Welsh Lords after the Edwardian Conquest". Welsh History Review. 5. Cardiff: University of Wales Press: 103–129 – via The National Library of Wales.
- —— (1977). "A Welsh Knight in the Hundred Years War: Sir Gregory Sais". Transactions of the Honourable Society of Cymmrodorion. London: The Honourable Society of Cymmrodorion: 40–53 – via The National Library of Wales.
- Davies, John; Jenkins, Nigel; Baines, Menna, eds. (2008). The Welsh Academy Encyclopaedia of Wales. Cardiff: University of Wales Press. ISBN 978-0708319536.
- Davies, John (1994). A History of Wales. London: Penguin Books. p. 195. ISBN 0-14-014581-8.
- Davies, R. R. (1995). The Revolt of Owain Glyn Dŵr. Oxford: Oxford University Press. doi:10.1093/acprof:oso/9780198205081.001.0001. ISBN 978-0198205081. IA revoltofowaingly0000davi_j0a7.
- Davies, R. R.; Morgan, Gerald (2009). Owain Glyn Dŵr: Prince of Wales. Ceredigion: Y Lolfa. ISBN 978-1-84771-127-4.
- Evans, David (2016). "Owain Glyndŵr". Owain Glyndŵr.
- Fortescue, Thomas, ed. (1874). De Laudibus Legum Angliae: A Treatise in Commendation of the Laws of England, by Chancellor Sir John Fortescue. Cincinnati: Robert Clarke & Co. IA delaudibuslegum00clergoog.
- Gillespie, James L. (1997). "Richard II: King of Battles?". In Gillespie, James L. (ed.). The Age of Richard II. Stroud: Sutton Publishing. ISBN 0312175841. IA ageofrichardii0000unse_w2x3.
- Given-Wilson, Chris, ed. (1997). The chronicle of Adam Usk, 1377-1421. Oxford: Clarendon Press. IA chronicleofadamu0000adam.
- Goodman, Anthony (1970). "Owain Glyndŵr before 1400". Welsh History Review. 6. Cardiff: University of Wales Press: 67–70.
- —— (1971). The Loyal Conspiracy: The Lords Appellant under Richard II. Coral Gable: University of Miami Press. ISBN 0870242156. IA isbn_0870242156.
- Gower, Jon (9 February 2012). The Story of Wales. Random House. ISBN 978-1-4464-1710-2.
- Guy, Ben, ed. (2020). Medieval Welsh Genealogy: an Introduction and Textual Study. Woodbridge: Boydell Press. ISBN 9781783275137.
- Henken, Elissa R. (1996). National Redeemer: Owain Glyndŵr in Welsh Tradition. Cornell University Press. ISBN 978-0-8014-8349-3.
- Holyoake, C. J. (1976). "Heraldic Notes on the issue of Postage Stamps". Family History: 15–43.
- Ifans, Rhiannon, ed. (2000). Gwaith Gruffudd Llwyd a'r Llygliwiaid Eraill (in Welsh). University of Wales Centre for Advance Welsh and Celtic Studies. ISBN 0947531165.
- Jack, R. Ian (1964–1966). "New Light on the Early Days of Owain Glyndŵr". Bulletin of the Board of Celtic Studies. 21. Cardiff: University of Wales Press: 163–166.
- Johnson, Peter (30 April 2020). The Vale of Rheidol Railway: The Story of a Narrow Gauge Survivor. Pen and Sword Transport. ISBN 978-1-5267-1808-2.
- Johnston, Dafydd, ed. (1993). Iolo Goch: Poems. Llandysul: Gomer Press. ISBN 9780863837074. IA iologochpoems0000iolo.
- ——, ed. (1995). Gwaith Lewys Glyn Cothi (in Welsh). Cardiff: University of Wales Press.
- —— (2014) [2005]. Llên yr Uchelwyr: Hanes Beirniadol Llenyddiaeth Gymraeg 1300–1525 (in Welsh) (2nd ed.). Cardiff: University of Wales Press. ISBN 9781783160525.
- Kingsford, Charles Lethbridge, ed. (1911). The first English life of King Henry the Fifth, written in 1513 by an anonymous author commonly known as The Translator of Livius. Oxford: Clarendon Press. IA cu31924027928047.
- Langston, Keith (1 January 2012). British Steam BR Standard Locomotives. Casemate Publishers. ISBN 978-1-84563-146-8.
- Lewis, Henry (1959). "Sion Cent (1367? - 1430?), poet". Dictionary of Welsh Biography. National Library of Wales.
- Lewis, Barry, ed. (2023). Bonedd y Saint: An edition and study of the genealogies of the Welsh saints. Dublin: Dublin Institute of Advanced Studies. ISBN 9781855002517.
- Lloyd, Jacob Youde W. (1881). "6". The History of the Princes. Vol. 1. Great Queen Street, London: T. Richards Printer.
- Lloyd, J.E. (1918–1919). "Owain Glyn Dŵr: His Family and Early History". Transactions of the Honourable Society of Cymmrodorion: 128–145.
  —— (1931). Owen Glendower: Owen Glyn Dŵr. Oxford: Clarendon Press. IA owenglendower0000unse_y7y9.
- Maxwell Lyte, H. C., ed. (1912). Calendar of various Chancery rolls, 1277-1326. London: HM Stationery Office – via HathiTrust Digital Library.
- Morgan, Owen (1911). A history of Wales from the Earliest Period: Including Hitherto Unrecorded Antiquarian Lore. – A History of Wales at Google Books
- Morgan, Philip (1987). War and Society in Medieval Cheshire, 1277 - 1403. Manchester: The Chetham Society. ISBN 0719013429. IA warsocietyinmedi0000morg.
- Mortimer, Ian (2013). The Fears of Henry IV: The Life of England's Self-Made King. Random House. pp. 226–. ISBN 978-1-4070-6633-2.
- "Seal impression: Owain Glyn Dwr Privy seal". museum.wales. 1992.
- Nicolas, Nicholas Harris, ed. (1832). De controversia in curia militari inter Ricardum Le Scrope et Robertum Grosvenor milites: rege Ricardo Secundo, MCCCLXXXV-MCCCXC e recordis in turre Londinensi asservatis (in Latin). Vol. 1. London: Samuel Bentley – via HathiTrust Digital Library.
- ——, ed. (1834). Proceedings and Ordinances of the Privy Council of England (in Anglo-Norman). Vol. 2, 12 Henry IV MCCCCX to 10 Henry V MCCCCXXII. London: G. Eyre and A. Spottiswoode. IA proceedingsando00unkngoog.
- "Pennal letter". library.wales.
- Palmer, J. J. N. (1972). England, France, and Christendom, 1377–99. London: Routledge & Kegan Paul. ISBN 0807811890. IA isbn_9780807811894_c1i4.
- Parteger, Edith (1989) [1972]. A Blood Field by Shrewsbury. Headline Book Publishing. ISBN 0747233667.
- Penberthy, David (June 2010). "Owain Glyndwr and his uprising – Interpretation Plan" (PDF). Cadw – Welsh Government. Cymdeithion Siân Shakespear Associates.
- Pennant, Thomas (1784). A tour in Wales. Vol. 2.
- Pierce, Thomas Jones (1959). "Owain Glyndwr (c. 1354–1416), 'Prince of Wales'". Dictionary of Welsh Biography. National Library of Wales.
- Pierce, Thomas Jones (1959). "LLYWELYN ap GRUFFYDD ('Llywelyn the Last,' or Llywelyn II), Prince of Wales (died 1282)". Dictionary of Welsh Biography. National Library of Wales.
- Powys, John Cowper (1941). Owen Glendower. Simon & Schuster.
- Prichard, Lorna (2 April 2025). "Michael Sheen to portray 'iconic' Welsh prince Owain Glyndwr". www.bbc.com.
- Reading, Brian; Reading, Ian (15 February 2023). Narrow Gauge and Industrial Railways: The Late 1940s to Late 1960s. Amberley Publishing Limited. ISBN 978-1-3981-0013-8.
- Riley, Henry Thomas, ed. (1866). Chronica Monasterii Sancti Albani Johannis de Trokelowe et Henrici de Blaneforde, Monachorum Sancti Albani, necnon quorundam anonymorum, Chronica et Annales Regnantibus Henrico Tertio, Edwardo Primo, Edwardo Secundo, Ricardo Secundo, et Henrico Quarto. Chronicles and Memorials of Great Britain and Ireland during the Middle Ages (in Latin). London: Longman, Green, Reader, and Dyer. IA johannisdetroke00rilegoog.
- Roberts, Emrys (2017). Highlights From Welsh History. Y Lolfa. ISBN 978-1-78461-482-9.
- "The "Owen Glendower", East Indiaman, 1000 Tons. (Entering Bombay Harbour)". The Collections. Royal Museums Greenwich.
- Stewart-Brown, R. (1938). "The Scrope and Grosvenor Controversy, 1385-1391" (PDF). Transactions of the Historic Society of Lancashire and Cheshire. 89. Liverpool: The Historic Society of Lancashire and Cheshire: 1–22.
- Shakespeare, William (1998). Bevington, David (ed.). Henry IV, Part 1. Oxford University Press. ISBN 978-0-19-283421-8.
- Siddons, Michael Powell (1991). The Development of Welsh Heraldry. Vol. 1. Aberystwyth: National Library of Wales. ISBN 090715851X.
- —— (1993). The Development of Welsh Heraldry. Vol. 2. Aberystwyth: National Library of Wales. ISBN 090715851X.
- Simpson, Grant G.; Galbraith, James D., eds. (1986). Calendar of Documents relating to Scotland, preserved in the Public Record Office and the British Library. Vol. 5, 1108–1516. Edinburgh: Scottish Record Office. IA calendarofdocume05grea.
- Skidmore, Ian (1978). Owain Glyndŵr: Prince of Wales. Swansea: Christopher Davies. p. 24. ISBN 0715404725.
- Smith, Llinos Beverley (1969–1970). "The Arundel Charters of the Lordship of Chirk in the Fourteenth Century". Bulletin of the Board of Celtic Studies. 23. Cardiff: University of Wales Press: 153–66.
- —— (2004). "Glyn Dŵr [Glyndŵr], Owain [Owain ap Gruffudd Fychan, Owen Glendower]". Oxford Dictionary of National Biography (online ed.). Oxford: Oxford University Press. doi:10.1093/ref:odnb/10816. (Subscription, Wikipedia Library access or UK public library membership required.)
- Stephenson, David (2016). Medieval Powys: Kingdom, Principality and Lordships, 1132-1293. Studies in Celtic History. Woodbridge: Boydell Press. ISBN 9781783271405.
- Stiefvater, Maggie (2015). The Raven King (The Raven Cycle, Book 4). Scholastic Press. p. 480. ISBN 978-0545424981.
- Turvey, Roger (2010). Twenty-One Welsh Princes. Conwy: Gwasg Carreg Gwalch. ISBN 9781845272692.
- Van Tilburg, Kees (2021). "Equestrian statue of Owain Glyndwr in Corwen UK".
- Wigley, Dafydd (16 September 2021). "Glyndŵr Day is worthy of a new national holiday". The National. Archived from the original on 2 December 2022.
- Williams, Phil (2003). The Psychology of Distance: Wales: One Nation. Institute of Welsh Affairs. p. 18. ISBN 978-1-86057-066-7.
- Williams, Gruffydd Aled (2011). "More than 'skimble-skamble stuff': the Medieval Welsh Poetry Associated with Owain Glyndŵr: 2010 Sir John Rhŷs Memorial Lecture" (PDF). Proceedings of the British Academy. 181. Archived from the original (PDF) on 26 July 2020.
  —— (2013). "Cywydd brud gan Robin Ddu a'i berthnasedd posibl i hanes Owain Glyndŵr". Dwned (in Welsh). 19: 96–102.
  —— (2017). The Last Days of Owain Glyndŵr. Talybont: Y Lolfa. ISBN 9781784614638.
- "Prifysgol Wrecsam/Wrexham University unveils rebrand and new name". Wrexham University. 25 September 2023.
- "100 Welsh Heroes". 100welshheroes. 2004. Archived from the original on 13 April 2014.

Titles in pretence
Preceded by English title: Henry of Monmouth (1399–1413); Welsh pretender: Owain Lawgoch (1372 – 78)	— TITULAR — Prince of Wales; 1400 – c. 1416	Succeeded by English title: Edward of Westminster (1453 – 1471); Welsh pretender: None
