= Rhys Gethin =

Rhys Gethin (died 1405) was a key figure in the revolt of Owain Glyndŵr's Welsh rebellion between 1400 and c. 1415 against the Kingdom of England. He was Glyndŵr's standard bearer and a leading general.

== Family ==
Rhys Gethin was a Welsh nobleman from Nant Conwy in Gwynedd who played a leading role in the rebellion of Owain Glyndŵr. He had a brother, Hywel Coetmor, who also played a significant role in the rising. Their father was Gruffudd Fychan ap Gruffudd ap Dafydd Goch ap Dafydd ap Gruffudd ap Llywelyn Fawr, through which they claimed that they were the grandsons of an illegitimate son of Dafydd ap Gruffydd and part of the royal dynasty of the kingdom of Gwynedd. Rhys married the daughter of Hywel ap Meirig Llwyd of Plas Nannau, Meirionnydd. His daughter Margred married Siancyn ap Dafydd ab y Crach ap Madog ap Goronwy ap Cynwrig, and their son was the Dafydd ap Siencyn.

Rhys Gethin lived at 'Hafod Rhys Gethin', Betws Wyrion Iddon in the parish of Betws-y-Coed, according to Sir John Wynn of Gwydir in his History of the Gwydir Family.

== Glyndŵr rebellion ==
In 1390, an English clergyman was appointed to the parish priesthood of Llanrwst by the Archbishop of Canterbury. The response of the local nobility was to force the monolingual Englishman to leave and to steal his property. Two of the leaders of the rebel attack were Rhys Gethin and his brother Hywel Coetmor.

When the Glyndŵr rebellion broke out in 1400 Rhys and Hywel joined in the cause as military leaders in the local area. Rhys had a flourishing career with the prince. He may have led Glyn Dŵr's army of 3,000 warriors at the Battle of Bryn Glas (22 June 1402). Later in the same year he is recorded as a captain of the prince's army in south Wales against the force of Henry IV of England. In 1403 he was with Owain attacking Carmarthen Castle. In March 1405 he was in South Wales again, this time unsuccessfully attacking the town of Grosmont and its castle; his army of about 8,000 men from Gwent and Glamorgan was defeated by a strong army sent from Hereford to lift the siege.

Rhys Gethin is thought to have been killed at either the Battle of Pwll Melyn or the Battle of Grosmont in 1405.

== Legacy ==
A cywydd (poem of praise) sometimes attributed to poet and bard Iolo Goch was written for Rhys Gethin. The poem describes the dislike of the Welsh had for living under English control and praises Rhys Gethin for his generosity and courage defending in beautiful Nant Conwy against the oppression of the foreigners.

In the 20th century, his name was used as a pseudonym in statements by Meibion Glyndŵr, a paramilitary Welsh nationalist group which undertook over 200 arson attacks against English-owned holiday cottages in Wales between 1979 and 1992.
