= Battle of Tuthill =

1401 battle in Caernarfon, Wales

Coordinates: 53.14°N 4.27°W

- Part of the Glyndŵr rebellion
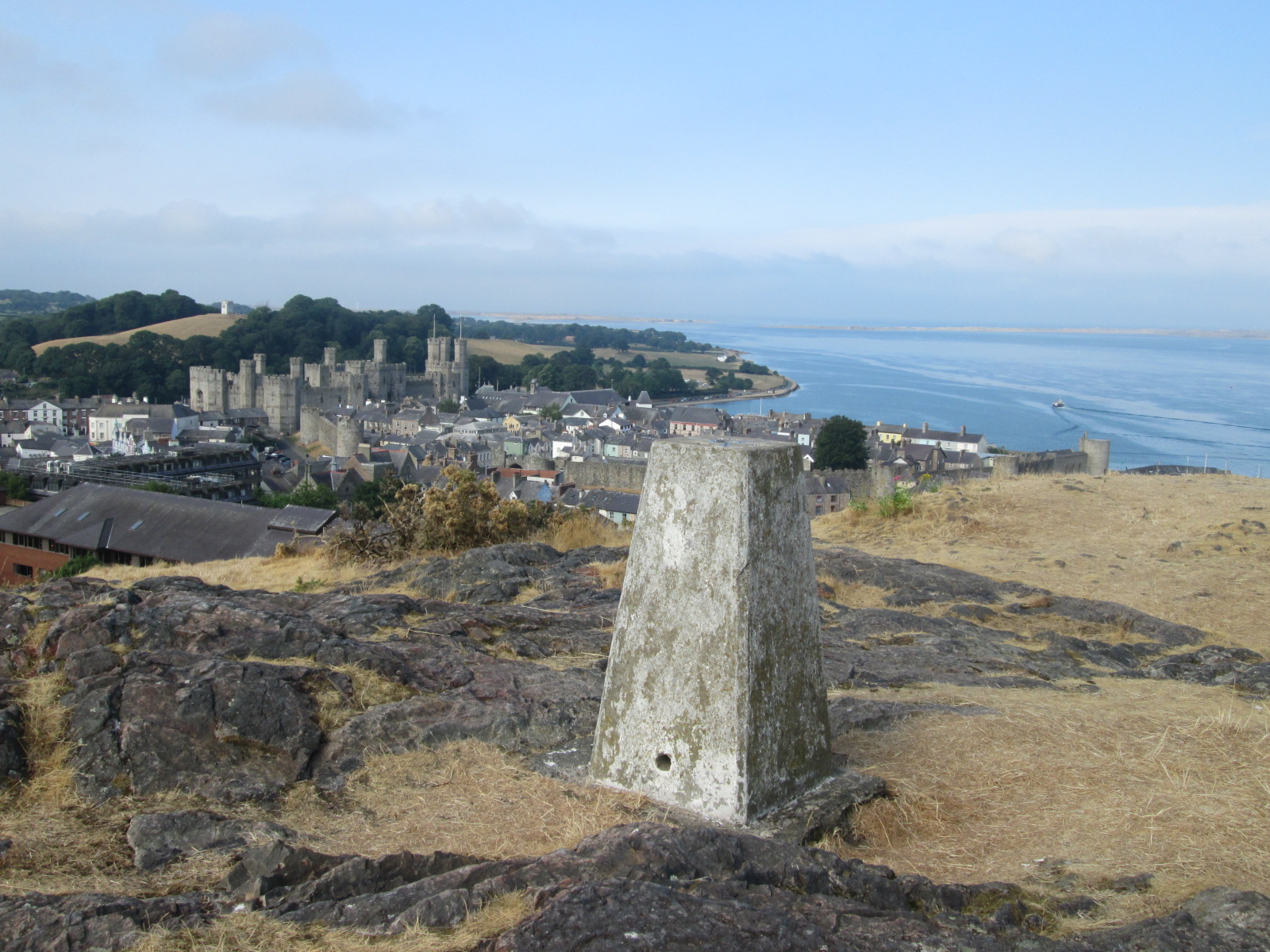
Date	2 November 1401
Location	Caernarfon
Result	Unknown

Belligerents
Wales	Kingdom of England

Commanders and leaders
Owain Glyndŵr	Unknown

Strength
Unknown	Unknown

Casualties and losses
300 killed	Unknown

The Battle of Tuthill took place at Caernarfon in North Wales on 2 November 1401 during the revolt of Owain Glyndŵr. Glyndŵr's success at the Battle of Mynydd Hyddgen the previous June had provided the revolt with fresh impetus, and the battle may be seen as indicative of his determination to foster revolt in the north-west after months of relative inaction in that area.

Glyndŵr flew a flag bearing a golden dragon on a white field, recalling the symbolism of Uther Pendragon. At this time in his campaign, his ideas seemed to have been grounded in the legendary traditions of Geoffrey of Monmouth and Nennius, as represented by this flag. His letters to the Scottish and Irish at this time also show his heavy influence by such mythical traditions. Nevertheless, he would soon adopt instead the colours of the House of Gwynedd more commonly associated with him. These latter arms asserted his more pragmatic claim to be in the line of the last native princes of Wales.

Little is known of the battle. Adam of Usk says of it:

In crastino Omnium Sanctorum, Oenus, volens obsidionem ponere circa Caernarvon, in multitudine glomerosa vixillum suum album cum dracone aureo ibidem displicuit; tamen per intraneos aggressus, trecentis* de suis interemptis, in fugam pulsus est.

That is:

Intending to lay siege to Caernarvon, Owen raised his standard, a golden dragon on a white field, in the midst of a great host there on the morrow of All Saints [2 November]; following an assault by the defenders, however, in which three hundred of his men were killed, he was driven off.

== Bibliography ==
- Davies, John (1994). A History of Wales. London: Penguin Books. p. 195. ISBN 0-14-014581-8.
- Davies, R. R. (20 February 1997). The Revolt of Owain Glyn Dwr. OUP Oxford. p. 353. ISBN 978-0-19-165646-0.
- Usk, Adam (1997). The chronicle of Adam Usk, 1377–1421. Oxford [England] : Clarendon Press; New York : Oxford University Press. ISBN 978-0-19-820483-1.
