= Battle of Mynydd Hyddgen =

1401 battle in Wales

- Part of Glyndŵr rebellion
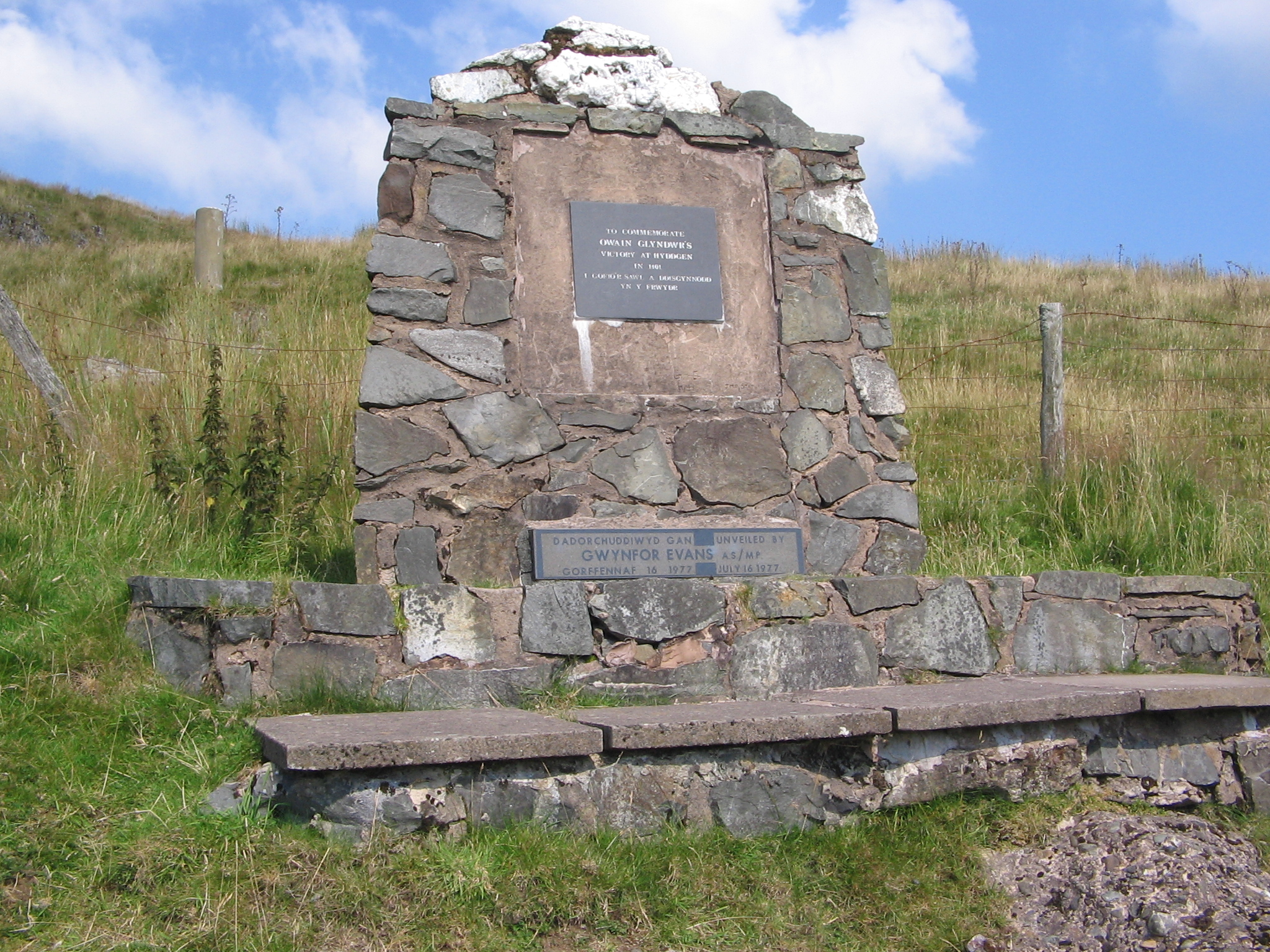
- Memorial to the slain of Mynydd Hyddgen
Date	June 1401
Location	Mynydd Hyddgen, in the wilds of Plynlimon (Pumlumon) 52.506°N 3.797°W
Result	Welsh victory

Belligerents
Wales	England

Commanders and leaders
Owain Glyndŵr	Unknown

Strength
120 to perhaps 500 (Note: Some have proposed this was the number of men-at-arms, supplemented by archers at a ratio of 3:1, giving a number of almost 500.)	1,500 or much less (Note: The account of 1,500 is doubted by historians but must have been at least several hundred.)

Casualties and losses
<50	200 killed

The Battle of Mynydd Hyddgen took place between the Welsh and English in June 1401. It was the first major victory by Owain Glyndŵr of the Welsh Revolt of 1400–1409. Its location was on the western slopes of Plynlimon, near the Ceredigion/Powys boundary. Glyndŵr, defending with a much smaller force, routed an attack of English and Flemish settlers and soldiers at a site on or close to Mynydd Hyddgen, a peak in the Ceredigion uplands.

The battle was significant in giving new impetus to the nascent rebellion, and provoking a punitive response from the English King, Henry IV. It is likely that Glyndŵr utilised the local geography to his advantage, perhaps drawing the forces into a trap using the natural draw of the land where a spring rises, buttressed by natural rock ramparts, although no confirmatory accounts of the battle exist, and the exact location is uncertain.

== Context ==
The Welsh Revolt began in 1400 when Owain Glyndŵr found himself in dispute with English earls, and the king refused to support him. He was proclaimed Prince of Wales by his followers in September that year, and various skirmishes ensued, orchestrated both by himself and by Rhys ap Tudur and Gwilym ap Tudur in North Wales. Henry IV, king of England, attempted to diffuse tensions by offering peace to all rebels except these three perpetrators, but by May of 1401 the King issued a royal commission owing to the real threat from Glyndŵr, who was assembling forces in Carmarthen and threatening the English realm in Pembrokeshire (a location known as Little England Beyond Wales). Initially Glyndŵr saw two set backs in North Wales, defeated at Mawddwy and Cader Idris, before he moved to a location on the slopes of Pumlumon in the Ceredigion uplands.

The sole authority for the battle is found in the fifteenth century Annales Oweni Glyndwr, a Welsh chronicle possibly written as early as 1422 or later up to the 1450s but later copied by Gruffydd Hiraethog many years later in 1550. This reads (in translation from Latin):

"The next summer after that, Owain rose up with six score wicked men and thieves, and he brought them as to war into the uplands of Ceredigion. And fifteen hundred men from the lowland of Ceredigion and Rhos and Pembroke assembled there and they came to the mountain to try to capture Owain. And on Hyddgant Mountain was the encounter between them, and as soon as the English host turned their backs to flee, two hundred of them were killed. And then great praise came to Owain, and there rose up with him a great part of the youth and the wicked men from every region of Wales until there was a great host with him."

Some historians have raised doubts as to whether this battle happened as per the above account, noting the lack of corroborative evidence in muster roles, records of payments or other accounts. Yet Historians agree that this battle explains a deterioration in the security situation in Wales, and the sudden change of posture from Henry IV towards the rebellion, lending credence to a significant victory for Glyndŵr.

== Armies ==
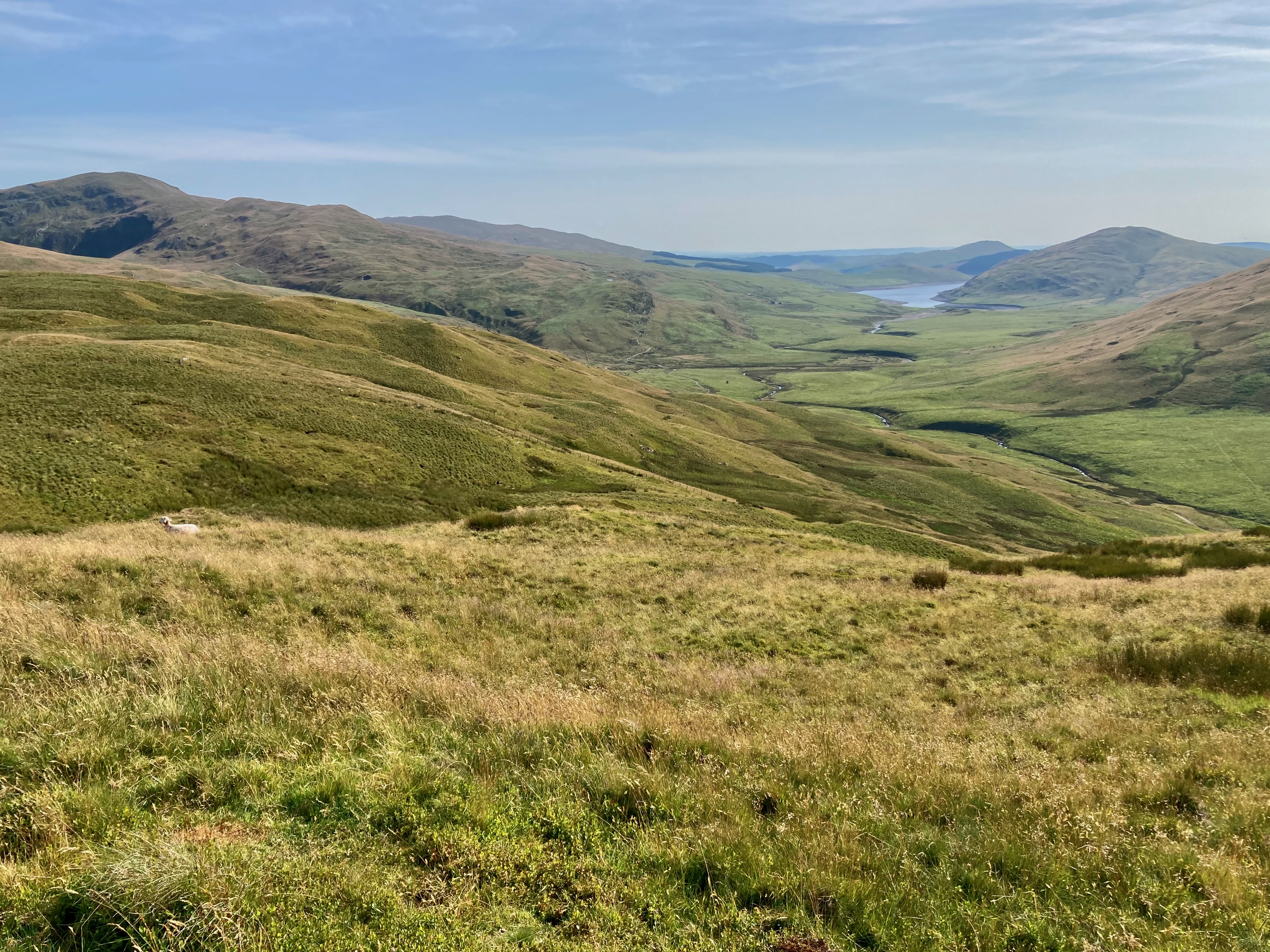
View to the south from Banc Lluestnewydd on Mynydd Hyddgen. The attack came from the south.

The English forces comprised Anglo-Fleming settlers from West Wales. The settler lands had previously been pillaged by Glyndŵr, so the force gathered to oppose Glyndŵr in his Mid Wales stronghold. The settlers were reinforced by a large force of English soldiers and Flemish mercenaries. Historians have doubted the relative size of the forces of ten to one, although there would have been several hundred in the Anglo-Flemish force. Alternatively, the author and antiquarian, Thomas Owen Morgan, proposed that the 120 in Glyndŵr's forces were supplemented by archers at a typical rate at the time of three to one, giving approaching 500 on his side. This number has been adopted by some later accounts. In any case, Glyndŵr is described as heavily outnumbered. Writers following Morgan's thesis, propose Glyndŵr's force would have been made up mostly of archers mounted on hill ponies that would have been well suited for travelling across boggy or mountainous regions.

The Anglo-Flemish army meanwhile would have probably consisted of infantry with some light cavalrymen supporting them. Despite having decent equipment, the English-Flemish soldiers lacked military experience, and their rout may suggest a general lack of discipline within their army, although an alternative proposal is that they succumbed to a flanking tactic.

== Location ==
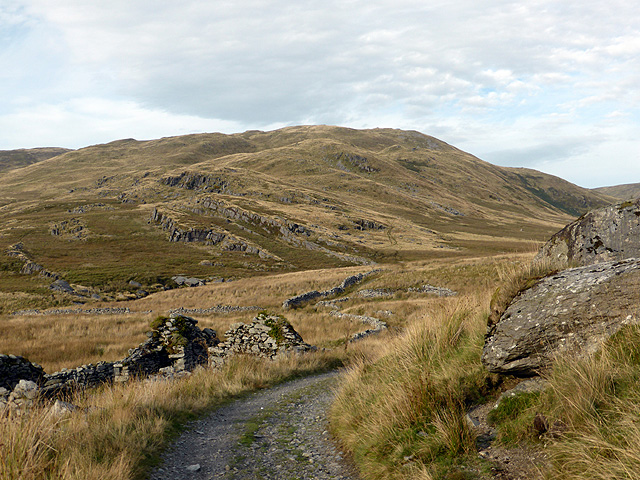
Banc Lluestnewydd and Mynydd Hyddgen viewed from Nant-y-llyn

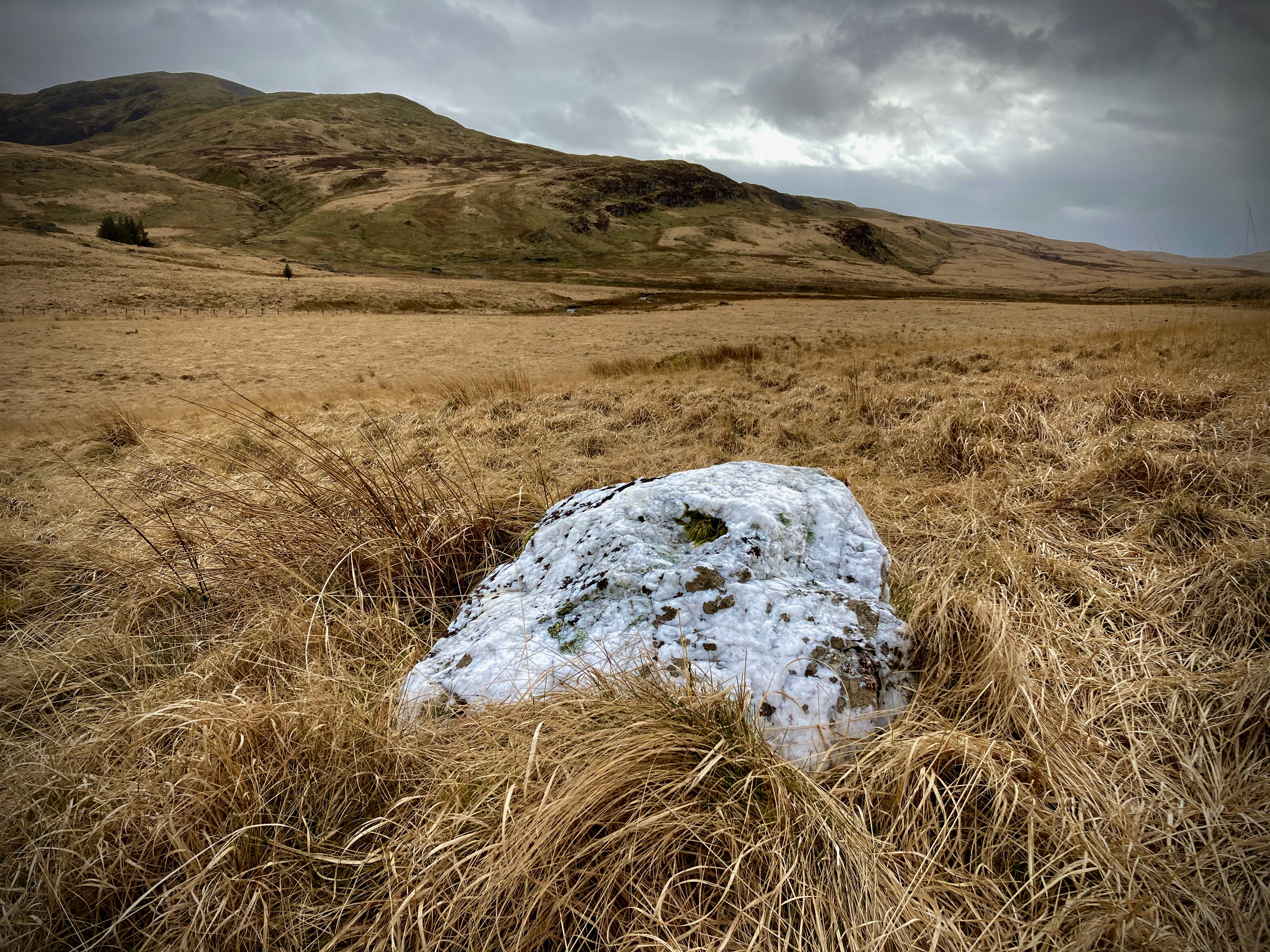
Covenant stone of Owain Glyndŵr looking towards Banc Lluestnewydd and Mynydd Hyddgen

The precise location of the battle is not known, and little is known of the course of the battle. Mynydd Hyddgen lies between the Hyddgen and Hengwm rivers in the Ceredigion uplands of Elenydd. The rivers meet at the southern end of the mountain (Mynydd means "mountain" in Welsh). One tradition places the battle close to the Hyddgen river, and associated with two white quartz blocks on the opposing bank, to the south of the summit, known as Glyndŵr's Covenant Stones. A battle at the summit is also possible, but across the Hyddgen river from the Covenant Stones lies an exposed knee of rock, Banc Lluestnewydd. A spring creates a natural draw up this slope, and a commanding view across both river valleys and unimpeded sight lines across the Elenydd uplands to the south. The attack came from the south, and as the location is strategically superior to the alternatives, and in sight of the Covenant Stones, this has also become a proposed location of the battle.

== Battle ==
There is no detailed account of the battle. It is known that Glyndŵr's army was able to fight back these attackers (despite being outnumbered and on the low ground), killing 200, chasing the main force away and taking prisoners from the rest. Owain's success may have laid in the maneuverability of his light troops. The English army (being more heavily laden) would have had more trouble traversing the marshy ground of the valley, and Glyndŵr's forces had ponies able to do so.

Another theory is proposed by historian Michael Livingston. He surveyed the proposed battle location of Banc Lluestnewydd and observed a flat area about the size of a sports pitch that lies out of sight from the land below, and on which a reserve force might be concealed. Noting Glyndŵr's known tactics in other battles, and his familiarity with the location, Livingston posits that Glyndŵr may have allowed half his forces to be seen on the low land, perhaps near the covenant stones, and this force allowed themselves to be pursued up Banc Lluestnewydd. This would account for the historical association of the stones with this battle. The exposed rocks of Banc Lluestnewydd create a natural rampart, and required the pursuit to follow the force, and not encircle them. Then, the reserve force would be able to reveal themselves and close the trap, encircling the English attackers.

== Aftermath ==
This first major victory for Glyndŵr prompted Henry IV to at last take the Welsh Revolt seriously. On 18 September he sent out calls to raise an army at Worcester, seeing the Welsh threat as a clear and present danger. This army then entered Wales to engage with Glyndŵr. Meanwhile the victory gave the rebellion new impetus, and allowed Glyndŵr to move south. He made his way to the Tywi valley, where he was "enthusiastically received". Henry was unable to bring the rebellion to a swift end, failing to engage in more than skirmishes until November saw them engage at Caernarfon in the indecisive Battle of Tuthill. Glyndŵr was also able to open negotiations with the French, Scots and Irish. The Welsh Revolt was not finally brought to an effective end until 1409, and Glyndŵr was never captured.

== Memorial ==
In 1977 a memorial was erected and unveiled at the Nant y Moch reservoir dam to commemorate the battle and to remember those killed. The memorial was unveiled by Gwynfor Evans, Member of Parliament for Carmarthenshire and then president of Plaid Cymru.

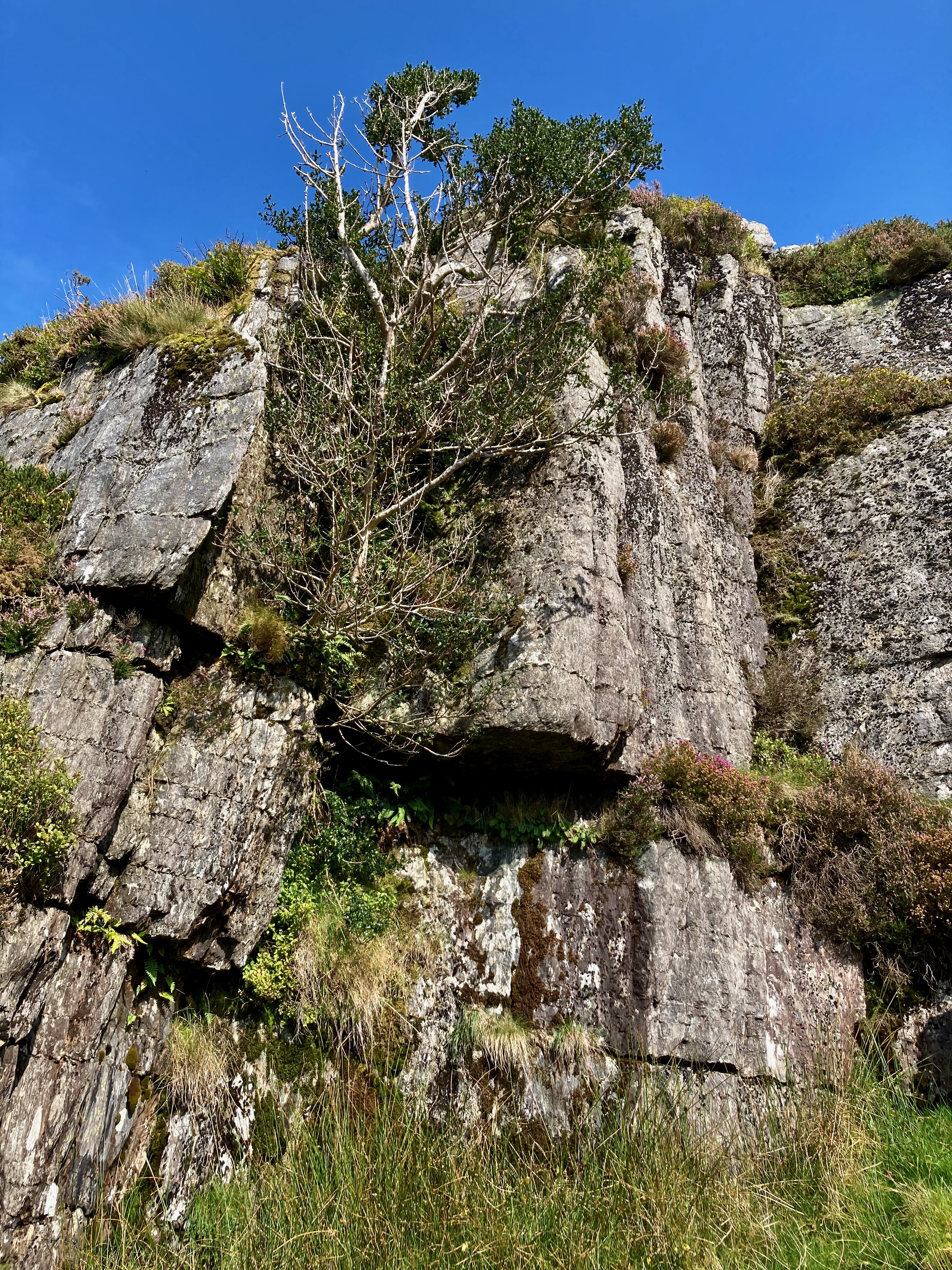
The natural rock rampart at Banc Lluestnewydd

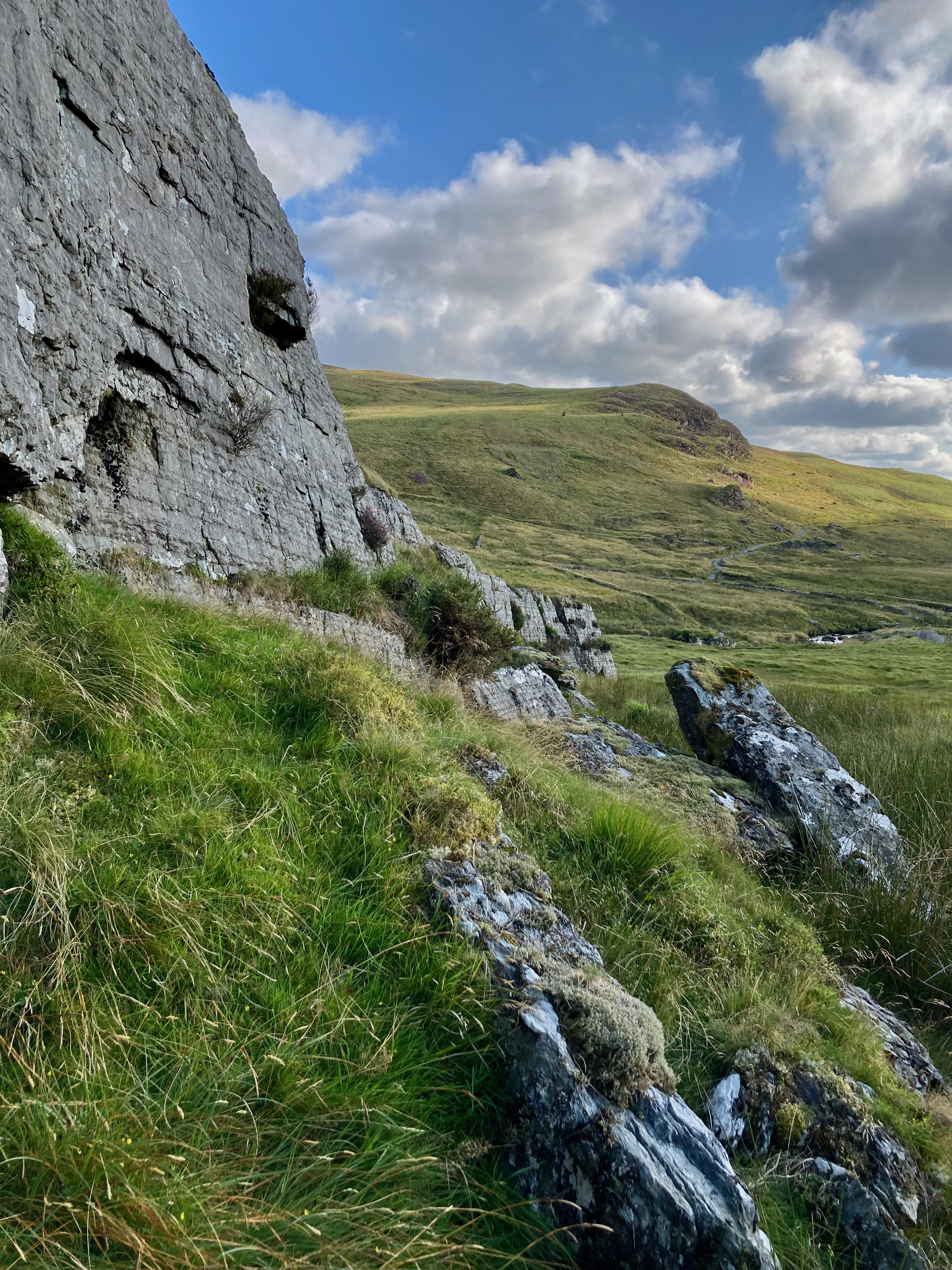
The view south from Banc Lluestnewydd

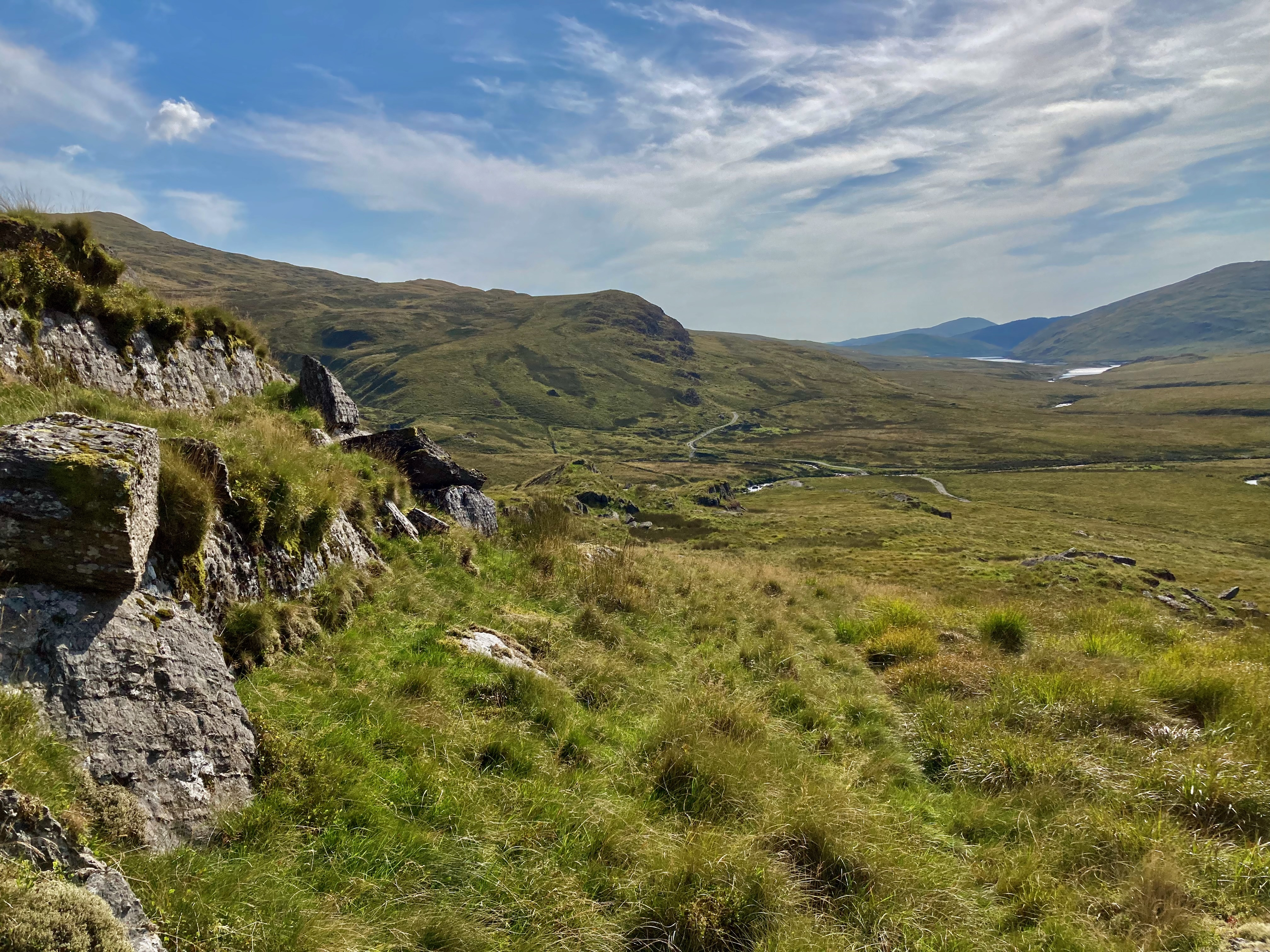
The view south from the foot of Banc Lluestnewydd

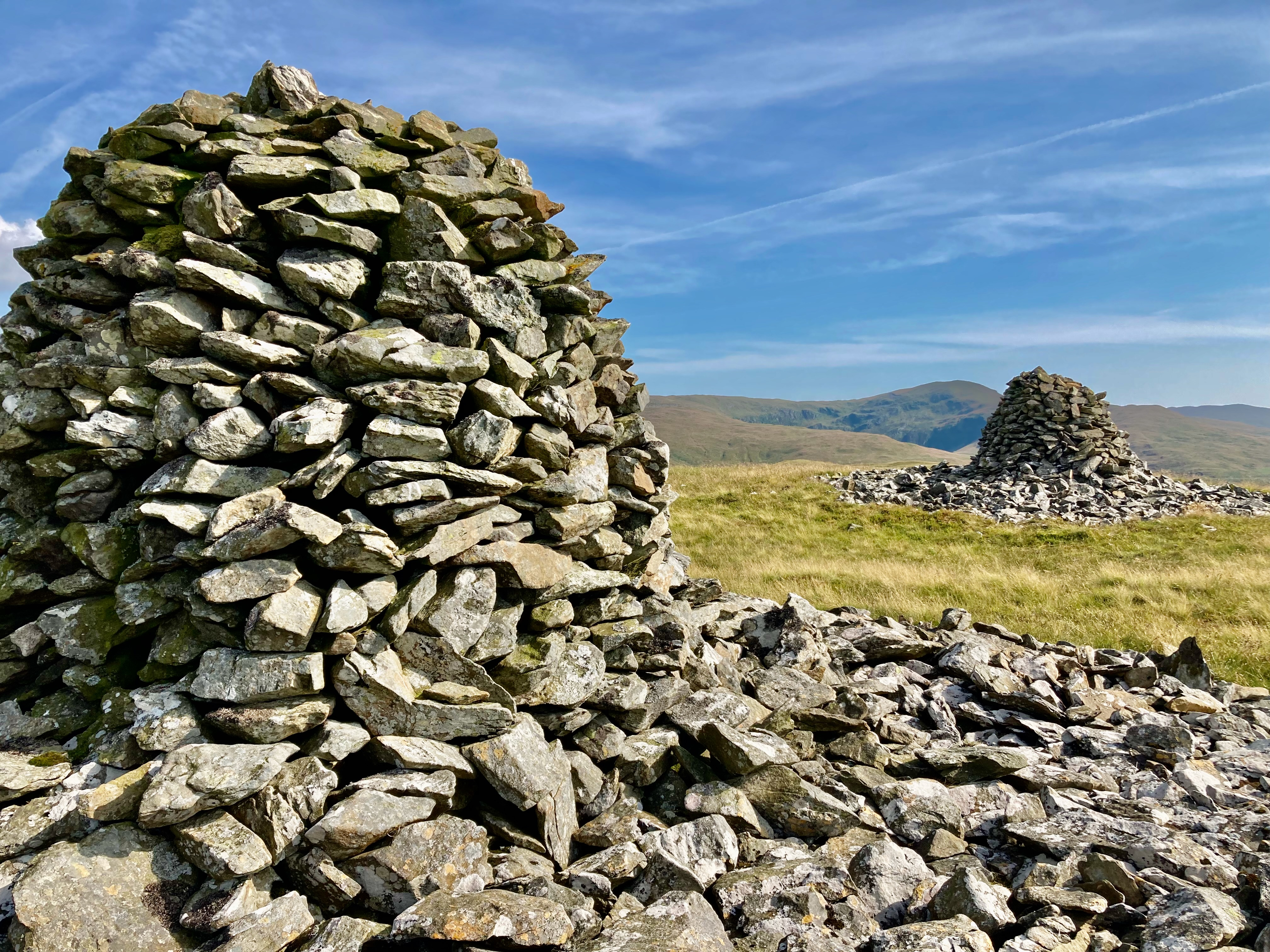
Carn Gwilym on the summit of Mynydd Hyddgen

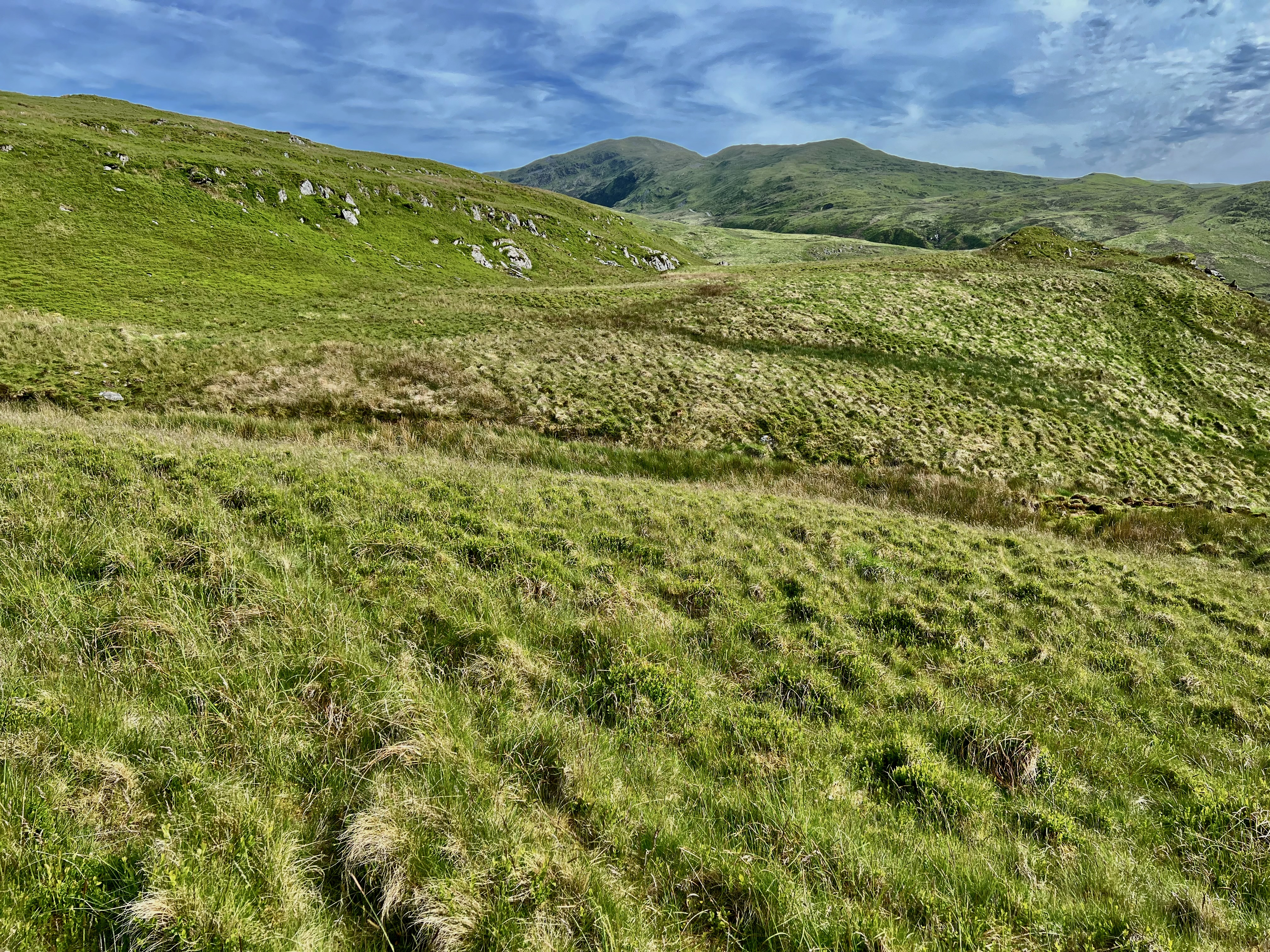
Proposed site of the Welsh ambush

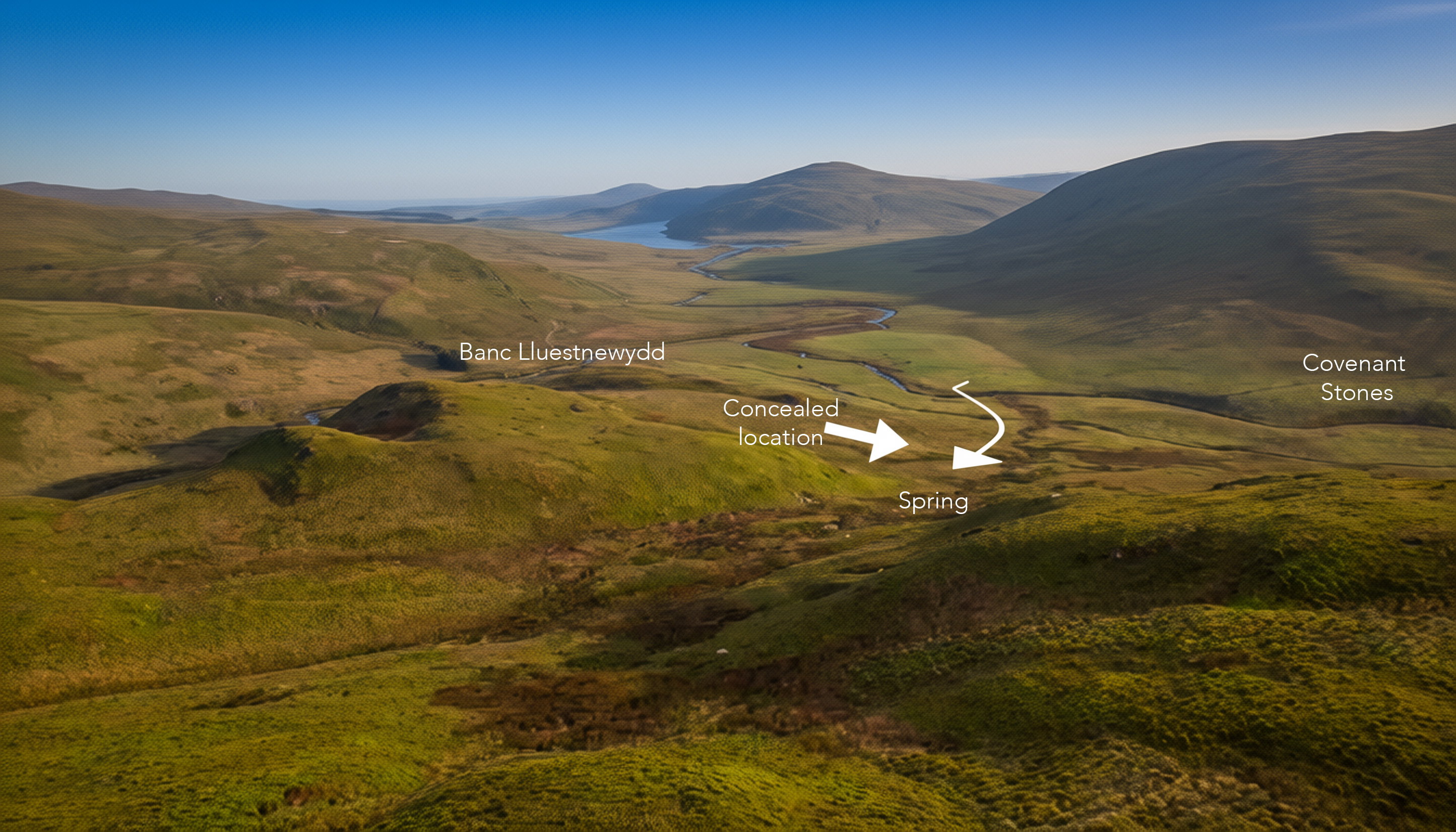
Aerial view of the proposed ambush site

== Bibliography ==
- Archaeologia Cambrensis vol. II (PDF). London: W. Pickering. 1851.
- Bradley, Arthur Granville (1901). Owen Glyndwr and the last struggle for Welsh independence, with a brief sketch of Welsh history;. New York: Putnam.
- Brough, Gideon (30 January 2017). The Rise and Fall of Owain Glyn Dwr: England, France and the Welsh Rebellion in the Late Middle Ages. Bloomsbury Publishing. ISBN 978-1-78673-110-4.
- Davies, John (1994). A History of Wales. London: Penguin Books. p. 195. ISBN 0-14-014581-8.
- Davies, R. R. (1995). The Revolt of Owain Glyn Dŵr. Oxford: Oxford University Press. pp. 293–324. doi:10.1093/acprof:oso/9780198205081.003.0012. ISBN 978-0198205081.
- Grant, R.G., ed. (2011). 1001 Battles That Changed the Course of History. New York. p. 212. ISBN 9780785835530.
- "Cairn marks famous victory". Liverpool Echo. 18 July 1977. p. 4.
- Livingston, Michael (2015). France, John; Rogers, Clifford J.; DeVries, Kelly (eds.). Journal of Medieval Military History: Volume XIII (PDF). Boydell & Brewer. pp. 167–178. ISBN 978-1-78327-057-6. JSTOR 10.7722/j.ctt17mvj2b.10.
- Livingston, Michael (2018). "The Battle of Hyddgen, 1401: If It Even Happened" (PDF). Medieval Warfare. 8 (1): 38–43. ISSN 2211-5129. JSTOR 48578881.
- Lloyd, Sir John Edward (1931). Owen Glendower: Owen Glyn Dŵr. Clarendon Press.
- Malaws, B.A. (2006). "Glyndwr's Covenant Stones, Afon Hyddgen (303679)". Coflein.
- Morgan, John (24 November 2005). "Hyddgen Walk" (PDF). bbc.co.uk. BBC.
- Morgan, T. O. (31 August 1850). "Notices, Historical and Traditional of Owen Glyndwr, by Thomas Owen Morgan, Barristers-at-law". North Wales Chronicle. p. 6.
- Tout, T. F. (1900). Owain Glyndwr and his times. Dartford, Perry.
