= Nennius =

9th-century Welsh monk and writer

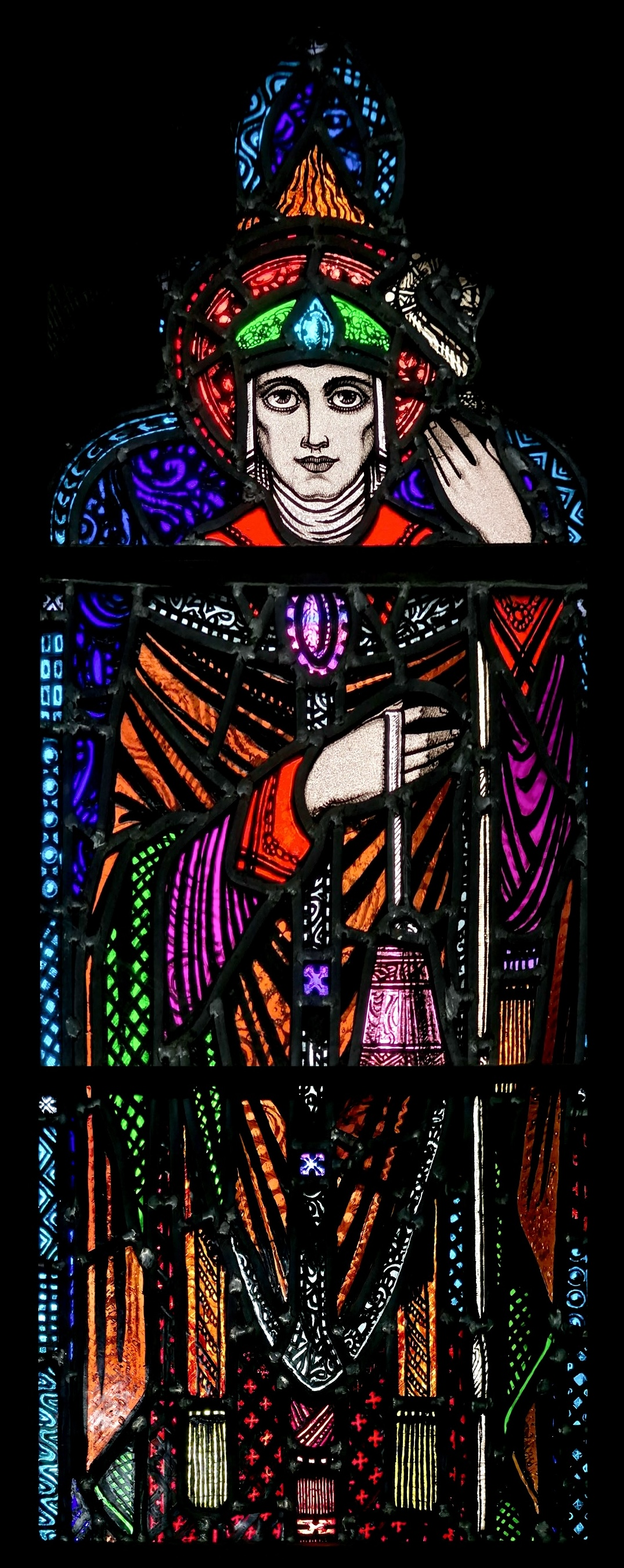
St. Nennius by Harry Clarke Studios at St. Joseph's Carrickmacross

Nennius – or Nemnius or Nemnivus – was a Welsh monk of the 9th century. He has traditionally been credited with authorship of the Historia Brittonum, based on the prologue affixed to that work.

Nennius was a student of Elvodugus, commonly identified with the bishop Elfodd of Bangor, who convinced British ecclesiastics to accept the Continental dating for Easter, and who died in 809 according to the Annales Cambriae.

Nennius is believed to have lived in the area made up by Brecknockshire and Radnorshire in present-day Powys, Wales. Thus, he lived outside the Anglo-Saxon kingdoms, isolated by mountains in a rural society. Because of the lack of evidence concerning the life of Nennius, he has become the subject of legend himself. Welsh traditions include Nennius with Elbodug and others said to have escaped the massacre of Welsh monks by Ethelfrid in 613, fleeing to the north.

== Authorship of the Historia Brittonum ==
Nennius was traditionally credited with having written the Historia Brittonum c. 830. The Historia Brittonum was highly influential, becoming a major contributor to the Arthurian legend, in particular for its inclusion of events relevant to debate about the historicity of King Arthur. It also includes the legendary origins of the Picts, Scots, St. Germanus and Vortigern, and documents events associated with the Anglo-Saxon invasion of the 7th century as contributed by a Northumbrian document.

Evidence suggests that the Historia Brittonum was a compilation of several sources, some of which are named by Nennius, while others are not. Some experts say that this was not the first compiled history of the Britons and that it was largely based on Gildas' De Excidio et Conquestu Britanniae written some three centuries before. Other sources included a Life of St Germanus and several royal pedigrees. Most other sources have not survived and therefore cannot be confirmed. The surviving manuscripts of the Historia Brittonum appear to be redacted from several lost versions: information about Nennius contained in the Prologue and in the Apology differs, the Prologue containing an expanded form of the Apology that is only found in editions copied during the 12th century, leading experts to believe that later versions of the document were altered. The largest known edition contains seventy-six sections including the Prologue and the Apology. The work was translated into Irish by Giolla Coemgin in c. 1071 and is the earliest example of the original Historia Brittonum, that includes the author's name, Nennius.

Originally written as a history of the Britons in an attempt to document a legitimate past, the Historia Brittonum contains stories of legend and superstition alike. The historical accuracy of the Historia Brittonum is at best questionable, but the document is internally consistent and provides information from and indirectly about Nennius' sources. Some historians argue that the Historia Brittonum gives good insight into the way 9th century Britons viewed themselves and their past. Nennius makes several attempts to trace the history of the Britons back to the Romans and Celts through his empirical observations of what he refers to as "The Marvels" or "Wonders of Britain". These include ruins, landmarks and other aspects of the British countryside that Nennius deems worthy of documentation. His explanation of the physical landmarks and ruins take on a mystical interpretation despite Nennius being a Christian monk. Within the writing of Nennius is a sense of nationalist pride attempting to legitimise the people of Britain and embellish the past through legend much as the Romans used the story of Romulus and Remus to legitimise the founding of Rome. One such example of Nennius stressing legend is in his accounts of Arthur and his twelve battles. The Historia Brittonum would come to be the basis on which later medieval authors such as Geoffrey of Monmouth would write the Historia Regum Britanniae, one of the early Welsh chronicles and romantic histories of King Arthur. Nennius however never refers to Arthur as a King instead calling him a "Dux Bellorum" who led the kings of Britain in battle, a military commander.

== Debate regarding his life and works ==
The Prologue, in which Nennius introduces his purpose and means for writing the British History, first appears in a manuscript from the twelfth century. The prologues of all other manuscripts, though only included marginally, so closely resemble this first prologue that William Newell claims they must be copies. "The preface has evidently been prepared by someone who had before him the completed text of the treatise. It appears in the first instance as a marginal gloss contained in a MS. of the twelfth century;' under ordinary conditions, the chapter would unhesitatingly be set aside as a forgery." He counters Zimmer's argument by reasoning that the Irishman responsible for the "superior" Irish translations might have added his own touches, further claiming that if a Latin version of the Historia had been available in the 12th century, it would have been replicated in that language, not translated.

David N. Dumville argues that the manuscript tradition and nature of the Prologue in particular fail to substantiate the claim that Nennius was the author of Historia Brittonum. In his argument against Zimmer, he cites a textual inconsistency in the Irish translation regarding a place called Beulan, concluding that "we must admit to ignorance of the name of [the Historia's] ninth-century author."

== Associated historians and authors ==
- Gildas – Sixth-century historian who lived in South-west Britain. Wrote De excidio et conquestu Britanniae, which focused largely on the history of Christian Britain but fails to give an in-depth look of the pagan period.
- Bede (the Venerable Bede) – Lived in Northumbria about half a century prior to Nennius. He wrote Historia Ecclesiastica Gentis Anglorum (Ecclesiastical History of the English People) over many years (completed 731 or 732). It includes a geographical description of the British Isles and focuses on the history of the Anglo-Saxon Church from St. Augustine's 597 mission though his preamble covers earlier ages.
- William of Malmesbury – Early twelfth-century historian. Recorded history of Britain by compiling both Anglo-Saxon and Anglo-Norman traditions. He was the first historian of England to make use of topography and ancient monuments as historical sources.
- Geoffrey Gaimar – Twelfth-century Norman historian who wrote L'Estoire des Engleis. It was the first known Romance in vernacular verse written in England.

== Notes ==
- Nennius (c. 796), Todd, James Henthorn; Algernon, Herbert (eds.), Leabhar Breathnach Annso Sis: The Irish Version of the Historia Britonum of Nennius, Dublin: The Irish Archaeological Society
