= Welsh chronicles =

A number of medieval chronicles of the history of Wales survive, notably the 9th century Historia Brittonum and the 10th century Annales Cambriae. These early chronicles are written in Latin, while from the 12th century, some are composed in Middle Welsh. The oldest surviving manuscripts of chronicles kept in the National Library of Wales, Aberystwyth date to the 13th century.

The history of Wales becomes tangible from the 7th century. Accounts in the chronicles pertaining to Dark Age Wales of the 5th and 6th century, including early references to King Arthur, Vortigern, Maelgwn Gwynedd and others, may contain semi-legendary or semi-historical material, which however cannot be substantiated as historical with any certainty.

Brut y Brenhinedd is the title given to Middle Welsh versions of Geoffrey of Monmouth's Historia Regum Britanniae. Brut y Tywysogion is a continuation of Historia Regum Britanniae, covering the period of 682 to 1332. The Brenhinoedd y Saeson survives in 14th-century manuscripts and covers events from 682 to 1282.

The Annals of Owain Glyndwr give an account of the Glyndŵr Rising, covering the period of 1400 to 1422.

== See also ==
- Wales in the Early Middle Ages
- King of the Britons
- List of legendary kings of Britain
