= 11th century in Wales =

- 10th century | 12th century | Other years in Wales
- Other events of the century

This article is about the particular significance of the century 1001–1100 to Wales and its people.

== Events ==
1005

- Aeddan ap Blegywryd succeeds Cynan ab Hywel as Prince of Gwynedd.

1018

- Llywelyn ap Seisyll defeats Aeddan ap Blegywryd in battle; Aeddan and his four sons are killed. Through marriage to Angharad ferch Maredudd ab Owain.

1022

- Llywelyn ap Seisyll defeats the Irish pretender Rhain at Abergwili.

1045

- Gruffydd ap Rhydderch expels Gruffydd ap Llywelyn from Deheubarth.

1055

- 24 October - Gruffydd ap Llywelyn defeats Ralph the Timid and sacks Hereford. He is now ruler of all Wales.

1056

- 10 February - Gruffydd ap Llywelyn defeats an English army at Glasbury.

1062

- Harold Godwinson makes a surprise attack on Gruffydd ap Llywelyn at Rhuddlan; Gruffydd escapes.

1063

- Tostig leads an army into north Wales.

1067

- Chepstow Castle is founded by William FitzOsbern, 1st Earl of Hereford.

1070

- Battle of Mechain between the sons of Gruffydd ap Llywelyn and the sons of Cynfyn ap Gwerstan of Powys.
- Bleddyn ap Cynfyn enacts new laws regulating the activities of bards and musicians.

1081

- Battle of Mynydd Carn: Gruffudd ap Cynan and Rhys ap Tewdwr defeat Trahaearn ap Caradog, Caradog ap Gruffydd and Meilir ap Rhiwallon. However, Gruffudd ap Cynan is subsequently captured and imprisoned by Hugh d'Avranches, 1st Earl of Chester, and his kingdom is granted to Robert of Rhuddlan, Hugh's cousin.

1088

- Bernard de Neufmarché begins creation of the Lordship of Brecknock by conquest.

1092

- Hervey le Breton is appointed Bishop of Bangor by William II of England.

1093

- 3 July - Robert of Rhuddlan is killed by a Welsh raiding party on the shores of the Great Orme and rule of his lands is taken over directly by his cousin Hugh of Chester.

1094

- Welsh revolt against Anglo-Norman rule. Cadwgan ap Bleddyn of Powys defeats a Norman force at the battle of Coed Yspwys.

1095

- Battle of Aber Llech secures Bernard de Neufmarché's Lordship of Brecknock, leading to the encastellation of Brycheiniog.
- William II of England attempts to suppress the revolt in north Wales with little success.

1096

- Battle of Celli Carnant in Pembrokeshire.

1097

- William II of England again attempts to suppress the revolt (at this time led by Cadwgan ap Bleddyn) with little success.

1098

- Hugh d'Avranches, Earl of Chester, and Hugh of Montgomery, Earl of Shrewsbury, attempt to recover lost Anglo-Norman territory in Gwynedd. In the Battle of Anglesey Sound (June or July) in which Magnus Barefoot, King of Norway, intervenes and Hugh of Shrewsbury is killed, the Normans are forced to give up Anglesey.

1099

- Gruffudd ap Cynan (having previously escaped from imprisonment) regains the throne of Gwynedd; and Cadwgan ap Bleddyn is able to reclaim part of Powys and Ceredigion on condition of doing homage to the new Earl of Shrewsbury, Robert of Bellême.

== Births ==
1054

- probable - Robert II, Duke of Normandy (a prisoner in Cardiff Castle during the 12th century)

== Deaths ==
1005

- date unknown - Cynan ap Hywel, Prince of Gwynedd

1010

- probable - Elystan Glodrydd, founder of the fifth Royal Tribe of Wales

1018

- date unknown - Aeddan ap Blegywryd, Prince of Gwynedd

1023

- date unknown - Llywelyn ap Seisyll, King of Gwynedd and Deheubarth

1025

- date unknown - Cynan ap Seisyll, brother of Llywelyn ap Seisyll

1033

- date unknown - Rhydderch ap Iestyn, ruler of Gwent, Morgannwg, Deheubarth and Powys

1044

- date unknown - Hywel ab Edwin, Prince of Deheubarth

1039

- date unknown - Iago ab Idwal ap Meurig, Prince of Gwynedd

1055

- date unknown - Gruffydd ap Rhydderch (in battle)

1063

- 5 August - Gruffydd ap Llywelyn, ruler of Wales (assassinated)
- probable - Cynan ab Iago, Prince of Gwynedd

1070

- probable - Rhiwallon ap Cynfyn, Prince and co-ruler of Gwynedd and Powys

1075

- date unknown - Bleddyn ap Cynfyn, Prince of Gwynedd and Powys

1078

- date unknown - Rhys ab Owain, King of Deheubarth

1081

- At the Battle of Mynydd Carn (date unknown)
  - Trahaearn ap Caradog, Prince of Gwynedd
  - Caradog ap Gruffydd

1088

- 3 July - Robert of Rhuddlan, Norman adventurer and lord of north-east Wales

1093

- April - Rhys ap Tewdwr, king of Deheubarth (killed in battle)
- date unknown - Iestyn ap Gwrgant, last native ruler of Glamorgan

1094

- 27 July - Roger de Montgomerie, 1st Earl of Shrewsbury

1099

- date unknown - Rhigyfarch, author of Life of Saint David
