= Morgan ap Hywel =

Lord of Gwynllwg
- In office c. 1215–c. 1248
- Preceded by: Hywel ab Iorwerth
- Succeeded by: Maredudd ap Gruffudd

Personal details
- Died: c. 1248

Morgan ap Hywel (died c. 1248) was Lord of Gwynllwg in Wales from about 1215 until his death in 1245, and for many years laid claim to the lordship of Caerleon, which had been seized by the Earl of Pembroke. For most of his life he was at peace with the English, at a time when there were periodic revolts by Welsh leaders against English rule. He may have participated in a crusade between 1227 and 1231.

== Background ==
Morgan ap Hywel was descended from Rhydderch ab Iestyn, a ruler of most of southern Wales whose grandson Caradog ap Gruffudd was killed in the Battle of Mynydd Carn in 1081. By the time of Caradog's death the Normans had taken control of Gwent and Gwynllwg was contested, and in the following years of the Norman conquest of Wales the Welsh royalty lost many strongholds and became subordinate to the English crown. Caradog's son Owain ap Caradog may have managed to hold onto Caerleon, and is mentioned in 1140; his son Morgan ab Owain was recognized as lord of Caerleon by King Henry II of England (reigned 1154–1189) before Morgan was killed by Ifor Bach in 1158 and succeeded by Iorwerth ab Owain Wan, his brother.

Henry II confiscated Caerleon from Iorwerth in September 1171 for undocumented reasons. In 1172 men of William Fitz Robert, 2nd Earl of Gloucester killed Iorwerth's son Owain, and Iorwerth and his surviving son Hywel launched a rebellion against the Normans. Iorwerth attended the council of Gloucester in June 1175, where Caerleon was restored to him at the urging of Rhys ap Gruffudd ("the Lord Rhys"; 1132–1197), lord of Deheubarth. Hywel ab Iorwerth seems to have succeeded his father as lord of Caerleon by 1184. He guarded castles in Glamorgan and Gwynllwg for the king during the Welsh revolt of 1184–1185, and continued to serve the crown in the reign of Richard I of England (reigned 1189–1199). Hywel of Caerleon appears to have died during the attacks led by Llywelyn the Great against the royal and Marcher lands in Wales in the early summer of 1215.

Places mentioned in Wales

== Life ==
Morgan ap Hywel, who succeeded his father Hywel, lost Caerleon in October 1217 to the forces of William Marshal, 1st Earl of Pembroke (1146–1219), lord of Striguil. Morgan's claim to Caerleon was dismissed by a council at Worcester in 1218, but he was again arguing his claim in 1220. In 1227 Morgan finally quitclaimed his right to Caerleon in favour of William Marshal the younger. He may have then participated in the final wave of the Fifth Crusade between 1227 and 1231. (Note: The "Count of Caerleon" is named by Reinhold Röhricht as one of the members of the Fifth Crusade who reached Damietta in 1218. This must refer to Morgan ap Hywel since his rival for that title, William Marshal, did not join the crusade. However, his absence during the dispute over Caerleon seems unlikely. The decision to quitclaim Caerleon in 1227, followed by absence from the records until 1231, suggests he might have been in Outremer at that time.)

Although Morgan was unable to regain Caerleon, he managed to retain Machen Castle for most of his life. Morgan strengthened this castle by the addition of a tower. He probably built the round tower keep of Machen Castle, or Castell Meredydd, in 1217. Gilbert Marshal, 4th Earl of Pembroke, captured Castell Meredydd in 1236 during a truce between Llywelyn the Great and King Henry III of England. After Marshal took the castle he seems to have fortified it with a bailey and curtain wall. He was forced to return it to Morgan by the terms of the truce, or "for fear of the lord Llywelyn". Some traces of the foundations of this castle may still be seen on the natural rocky motte on which it was built.

Morgan was one of the few Welsh leaders who did not join the revolt of Dafydd ap Llywelyn in June 1244. Morgan died not long before 15 March 1248. At the time of his death he held Machen Castle in the uplands of Gwynllwg and the commotes of Edeligion and Llenbenydd in the lordship of Caerleon in Gwent. He was succeeded by his grandson Maredudd ap Gruffudd (died 1270), son of his daughter Gwerful and of Gruffudd ap Maredudd, a grandson of the Lord Rhys.

== Sources ==
- Breverton, Terry (22 August 2013), Wales' 1000 Best Heritage Sites, Amberley Publishing Limited, ISBN 978-1-4456-2013-8
- Davis, Paul R. (8 March 2011), Castles of the Welsh Princes, Y Lolfa, ISBN 978-0-86243-970-5
- Hurlock, Kathryn (31 October 2011), Wales and The Crusades, University of Wales Press, ISBN 978-0-7083-2428-8
- Jenkins, Robert Thomas (1959), "MORGAN ap HYWEL", Dictionary of Welsh Biography, Honourable Society of Cymmrodorion
- Pryce, Huw; Insley, Charles (1 October 2010), The Acts of Welsh Rulers: 1120–1283, University of Wales Press, ISBN 978-0-7083-2387-8
