= 1081 =

1081 in various calendars
- Gregorian calendar: 1081; MLXXXI
- Ab urbe condita: 1834
- Armenian calendar: 530; ԹՎ ՇԼ
- Assyrian calendar: 5831
- Balinese saka calendar: 1002–1003
- Bengali calendar: 487–488
- Berber calendar: 2031
- English Regnal year: 15 Will. 1 – 16 Will. 1
- Buddhist calendar: 1625
- Burmese calendar: 443
- Byzantine calendar: 6589–6590
- Chinese calendar: 庚申年 (Metal Monkey); 3778 or 3571 — to — 辛酉年 (Metal Rooster); 3779 or 3572
- Coptic calendar: 797–798
- Discordian calendar: 2247
- Ethiopian calendar: 1073–1074
- Hebrew calendar: 4841–4842
- Hindu calendars
- Vikram Samvat: 1137–1138
- Shaka Samvat: 1002–1003
- Kali Yuga: 4181–4182
- Holocene calendar: 11081
- Igbo calendar: 81–82
- Iranian calendar: 459–460
- Islamic calendar: 473–474
- Japanese calendar: Jōryaku 5 / Eihō 1 (永保元年)
- Javanese calendar: 985–986
- Julian calendar: 1081; MLXXXI
- Korean calendar: 3414
- Minguo calendar: 831 before ROC 民前831年
- Nanakshahi calendar: −387
- Seleucid era: 1392/1393 AG
- Thai solar calendar: 1623–1624
- Tibetan calendar: ལྕགས་ཕོ་སྤྲེ་ལོ་ (male Iron-Monkey); 1207 or 826 or 54 — to — ལྕགས་མོ་བྱ་ལོ་ (female Iron-Bird); 1208 or 827 or 55

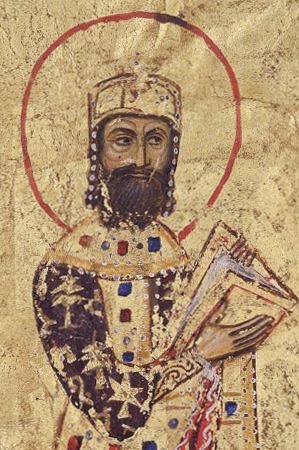
Alexios I Komnenos (r. 1081–1118), founder of the Komnenos dynasty.

Year 1081 (MLXXXI) was a common year starting on Friday of the Julian calendar.

== Events ==
=== By place ===
==== Byzantine Empire ====
- April 1 – Emperor Nikephoros III is forced to abdicate the throne, and retires to the Peribleptos monastery. He is succeeded by Alexios I Komnenos, who is crowned on April 5, as ruler of the Byzantine Empire. His brother-in-law Nikephoros Melissenos supports Alexios as new emperor, in exchange for the title of Caesar (co-emperor), and is appointed as commander of the Byzantine armies in the West.
- May – A Norman fleet of 150 ships (including 60 horse transports), led by Duke Robert Guiscard, sets off towards the Dalmatian coast. An army of 15,000 men (including about 1,300 Norman knights) sails to the city of Avalona (modern Albania); they are joined by several ships from Ragusa, a republic in the Balkans who are enemies of the Byzantines.
- October 18 – Battle of Dyrrhachium: After taking the island of Corfu, Robert Guiscard advances to Dyrrhachium (modern-day Durrës), and lays siege to the city. Alexios I Komnenos attempts to defend Illyria from the Normans (the first recorded mention of Albania), but is defeated by Guiscard, outside Dyrrhachium, the Byzantine capital city of Illyria.

==== Europe ====
- King Alfonso VI ("the Brave") of Castile exiles his most famous commander, El Cid, who goes into exile and offers his services to the twins – Counts Ramon Berenguer II and Berenguer Ramon II of Barcelona, but is turned down. He ends up in the service of Emir Yusuf al-Mu'taman ibn Hud of Zaragoza.
- King Mihailo ("King of the Slavs") dies after a 30-year reign. He is succeeded by his son, Constantine Bodin as ruler of Duklja (until 1101).

==== Britain ====
- Battle of Mynydd Carn (near St Davids in Wales): Gruffudd ap Cynan in alliance with Rhys ap Tewdwr, prince of Deheubarth, defeats the forces of Trahaearn ap Caradog, Caradog ap Gruffydd and Meilir ap Rhiwallon (who are all killed), allowing Gruffudd to claim the Kingdom of Gwynedd.
- King William the Conqueror of England orders the creation of a castle at Cardiff during his armed pilgrimage in southern Wales. The first castle on the site would be a motte and bailey type and is built on existing Roman fortifications.

==== Seljuk Empire ====
- Seljuk emir Tzachas (or Chaka Bey) conquers Smyrna (modern-day İzmir) and founds a short-lived independent state, which emerges as the first sea power in Turkish history.

=== By topic ===
==== Religion ====
- Pope Gregory VII writes a letter to Bishop Hermann of Metz about the behavior of Henry IV, Holy Roman Emperor (approximate date).
- Construction begins on St. Canute's Cathedral in Odense (modern Denmark).

== Births ==
- Louis VI ("the Fat"), king of France (approximate date)
- Gruffydd ap Rhys, Welsh king of Deheubarth (d. 1137)
- Rudolf I, count of Bregenz and Chur (d. 1160)
- Satake Masayoshi, Japanese samurai (d. 1147)
- Suger, French abbot and historian (approximate date) (d. 1151)
- William I, count of Luxembourg (d. 1131)
- Zhang Bangchang, Chinese prime minister (d. 1127)
- Zhao Mingcheng, Chinese scholar-official (d. 1129)

== Deaths ==
- January/February – Ibn Hayyus, Syrian poet and panegyrist (b. 1003)
- April 2/3 – Bolesław II the Bold (or "the Generous"), king of Poland (or 1082)
- June – Bernard of Menthon, French priest and saint
- September 1 – Eusebius (or Bruno), bishop of Angers
- October 18
  - Konstantios Doukas, Byzantine emperor (b. 1060)
  - Nikephoros Palaiologos, Byzantine general
- December 10 – Nikephoros III, Byzantine emperor
- December 21 – Abu al-Walid al-Baji, Moorish scholar and poet (b. 1013)
- Abelard of Hauteville, Italo-Norman nobleman
- Artau I, count of Pallars Sobirà (approximate date)
- Caradog ap Gruffydd, prince of Gwent, killed in battle
- Jōjin, Japanese Tendai monk and writer (b. 1011)
- Mihailo ("King of the Slavs"), Serbian king of Duklja
- Trahaearn ap Caradog, Welsh king of Gwynedd, killed in battle (b. 1044)
