= Owain ap Caradog =

Owain ap Caradog (fl. 1081–1116), known as Owain ‘Wan’ (or ‘weak’) was the son and heir of King Caradog ap Gruffydd of Morgannwg, who contested the Kingdom of Deheubarth and was killed in the Battle of Mynydd Carn in 1081. Owain contented himself by ruling the former sub-kingdom and later Lordship of Gwynllwg, while the title of King of Morgannwg went to his relative Iestyn ap Gwrgant, who was subsequently deposed c. 1090 as part of the Norman conquest of Wales. In spite of this Owain continued to hold onto territories between the Rhymney and Usk, and may, probably with some struggle, have held onto some or all of Caerleon, where in 1086 the Domesday Book records that a small colony of eight carucates of land (about 1.5 square miles) was held by Turstin FitzRolf, standard bearer to William the Conqueror at Hastings, under the overlordship of William d'Ecouis, a magnate with lands in Herefordshire, Norfolk and other counties. Also listed on the manor were three Welshmen with as many ploughs and carucates, who continued their Welsh customs (leges Walensi viventes).

== Succession ==
After Owain's death his son and heir Morgan ab Owain was recognized as Lord of Caerleon by King Henry II, before being killed by Ifor Bach, whereupon the Lordship passed to Morgan's brother, Iorwerth ab Owain. Caerleon remained in this hands of his descendants, subject to occasional struggles, until William Marshal retook the castle in 1217 from Morgan ap Hywel.

Preceded by Caradog ap Gruffydd	Lord of Gwynllwg-Caerleon before 1081–c. 1145	Succeeded by Morgan ab Owain
