= Einion ap Collwyn =

Legendary eleventh-century Welsh prince

Einion ap Collwyn (sometimes "ap Gollwyn") (fl. 1093), was a Welsh prince and warrior supposed to have existed in the eleventh century. Not mentioned in medieval chronicles, he is the subject of possibly legendary or fictional writings from the sixteenth century onwards, the oldest surviving report being that of the Tudor antiquary John Leland. Some Welsh family genealogies claimed descent from Einion.

== Recorded history ==
Einion may have been the brother or son of the historical figure Cadifor ap Collwyn (Cedivor in some anglicisations), Lord of Dyfed. Cadifor was the male-line heir of the original dynasty of Dyfed (the last of which known to have ruled as king was his ancestor, Triffyn ap Rhain). When Cadifor died in 1092, his sons Einion and Llewelyn (unlike their father) refused to accept Rhys ap Tewdwr as king of Deheubarth, instead sending for Rhys's cousin, Gruffydd; unlike Rhys, Gruffydd was the son of a previous king (Gruffudd's father being Maredudd ab Owain). Although this revolt was crushed, and Cadifor's sons and Gruffydd were killed by Rhys in battle at Llandydoch, it destabilised Rhys' kingdom, giving assistance to the Anglo-Norman marcher lords, who were extending their conquests in Wales. Next year Rhys was slain while attacking Bernard of Neumarche (husband of Nest, the granddaughter of the only King of Wales) in Brycheiniog. The conquests of Dyfed and Ceredigion immediately followed the death of Rhys.

Einion ap Collwyn's name, however, does not appear in records of this history, and he is mentioned only in the legendary accounts of the conquest of Glamorgan by the Normans. Both Lewis Glyn Cothi and Gwilym Tew say that Einion originated from Gwynedd, while other writers link him to Ednowain ap Bleddyn of Ardudwy and claim he was a relative of Iestyn, perhaps a great-nephew.

== Legendary material ==
The legend now begins. Einion, the brother of Cadifor, fled from the triumph of Rhys at Llandydoch to Iestyn ap Gwrgant (son of Gwrgan) prince of Morgannwg, who was also a rebel against Rhys. Einion had been previously in England and had served the king in France and other lands and knew both William II of England and his great barons well. He proposed to bring his Norman friends to Iestyn's aid on condition that he marry the daughter of Iestyn and receive the lordship of Miskin as her dowry. Iestyn accepted the proposal. Einion visited his English friends at London. He persuaded Robert FitzHamon, historically lord of the honour of Gloucester, and twelve other knights, to bring a great army to the aid of Iestyn. Rhys was slain by them in a terrible battle near the boundaries of Brycheiniog, at Hirwaun Gwrgan. With Rhys fell the kingdom of South Wales.

The Normans, having done their work for Iestyn, received their pay and returned towards London. They had hardly departed when Iestyn, flushed with his triumph, treacherously refused Einion his daughter's hand. Einion pursued the retreating Frenchmen, explained to them his own wrongs and the general unpopularity of Iestyn, and showed how easy it would be for them to conquer Iestyn's dominions, since his treason to Rhys had so much disgusted the South Wales princes that not one would afford him succour. The Normans were easily persuaded. Einion meanwhile organised a Welsh revolt. They jointly spoiled Morgannwg, but the Normans took the rich Vale of Glamorgan for their own share and left Einion only the mountainous areas of Senghenydd and Miscin, while the sons of Iestyn were rewarded for their acquiescence in their father's fate by the lowland lordship of Aberafan. Induced by the victory of FitzHamon, other Normans seized on Dyved, Ceredigion, Brycheiniog. Thus the treachery of Einion put all South Wales into the hands of the foreigner.

This full and elaborate story is first found in the "Brut y Tywysogion" (first printed in the second volume of the Myvyrian Archaeology, and later with a translation by Aneurin Owen for the Cambrian Archæological Association in 1863). But the original manuscript of this "Brut" is believed not to be older than the middle of the sixteenth century, and therefore not much earlier than David Powel's History of Cambria (1584), in which the story of the conquest of Glamorgan also appears at length, varying from the above account in only a few details. There are here added, however, long pedigrees of the descendants of the Twelve Knights of Glamorgan, and it has been suggested that inventors of the pedigrees for Glamorganshire families created the legend.
