= Hywel ab Iorwerth =

Welsh lord of Caerleon

Arms of Hywel of Caerleon

Hywel ab Iorwerth (also known as Hywel of Caerleon) (d. around 1216) was a Welsh lord of Caerleon.

He was the eldest surviving son of Iorwerth ab Owain, a grandson of Caradog ap Gruffydd and Lord of Caerleon. In 1173 he captured Caerleon Castle and the plains of Gwent from Richard Strongbow, Lord of Chepstow. In 1175 he blinded and castrated his uncle Owain Pen-Carn, his father's younger brother, to secure his inheritance. In 1184 at the latest he became heir to his father and lord of Llefennydd, Caerleon and the wooded mountainous region of Gwynllŵg. He is considered to be the founder of the Cistercian Llantarnam Abbey, although it may have been founded by his father. In 1182 in retaliation for the Abergavenny massacre in which his uncle Seisyll ap Dyfnwal had been slain, he burned down Abergavenny Castle of the Anglo-Norman baron William de Braose. However, he was the only Welsh lord in south-east Wales who supported the English during the 1184-85 uprising after the death of William FitzRobert, 2nd Earl of Gloucester. He led a force to defend Glamorgan against Welsh attacks and served as castellan of Newcastle near Bridgend. In the following years he continued to be on the side of the English and signed documents as Hywel, Lord of Caerleon. After 1199 he lost a lawsuit against his sister Nest, who was awarded an estate at Newport from him after her husband's death.

He was succeeded by his son Morgan ap Hywel. His daughter Gwenllian married Maredudd Gethin, a son of Lord Rhys.

== Sources ==
- Crouch, David. "Hywel ab Iorwerth [Hywel of Caerleon] (d. in or before 1216)". Oxford Dictionary of National Biography (online ed.). Oxford University Press. doi:10.1093/ref:odnb/62213. (Subscription or UK public library membership required.)
