= Cadwgan ap Meurig =

Cadwgan ap Meurig (fl. 1045–1074) was a medieval Welsh ruler who reigned over the petty kingdoms of Gwent and Morgannwg in the tumultuous years of dynastic struggle leading up to the Norman invasion of Wales. He sought unsuccessfully to prevent William FitzOsbern and his army from their advance in south Wales.

The chronicler Orderic Vitalis noted in his Historia Ecclesiastica that a Welsh king named "Caducan" suffered defeat in battle at the hands of William FitzOsbern, 1st Earl of Hereford, which would have happened in the year 1070. Subsequently, the Normans established dominance in Gwent and Cadwgan was deposed by an ambitious subject named Caradog ap Gruffydd, son of the former king Gruffydd ap Rhydderch. Whether killed or merely driven away, the ultimate fate of Cadwgan is unclear.

Regnal titles
Preceded by Gruffydd ap Llywelyn	King of Gwent; 1063–1074	Succeeded by Caradog ap Gruffydd
