= Iorwerth ab Owain =

Welsh prince of Gwynllwg

Iorwerth ab Owain (also known as Iorwerth of Gwynllŵg) (d. before 1184) was a Welsh prince of Gwynllŵg and Lord of Caerleon.

== Life ==
He was a son of Owain ap Caradog and thus a grandson of King Caradog ap Gruffydd of Gwent. In 1136 together with his older brother Morgan ab Owain he attacked and murdered Richard FitzGilbert de Clare in an ambush between Abergavenny and Talgarth. Iorwerth also supported his brother during the subsequent reconquest of Upper Gwent and Llenfennydd. As a result of this close alliance, he became his heir and successor after Morgan's murder in 1158, although Morgan left at least two sons. In contrast to his brother, however, he did not claim the title of king.

Richard de Clare, the Lord of Chepstow, retook Usk Castle before 1169. In 1171 the Lord Rhys together with the English king Henry II, who was on his way to Ireland, drove Iorwerth from Caerleon Castle. Iorwerth had to retire to Machen Castle in Gwynllŵg. After Henry II had traveled on to Pembroke, Iorwerth, his sons and his nephew Morgan ap Seisyll tried in vain to recapture Caerleon Castle. After the siege failed, they sacked and ravaged the Llefennydd region. In 1172 Iorwerth's eldest son Owain and Iorwerth's brother-in-law Seisyll ap Dyfnwal, Lord of Upper Gwent, were attacked by soldiers of the Earl of Gloucester on their way to Usk Castle, where they were going to negotiate with Henry II. While Seisyll was captured, Owain was murdered. To exact revenge, Iorwerth and his son Hywel plundered large areas of Herefordshire and Gloucestershire. When the king's power was weakened by the rebellion of his sons the next year, Iorwerth and Hywel took advantage of this with further attacks and conquests. After a three-day siege, they were able to recapture Caerleon Castle on 21 July 1173, and subsequently also occupy the Lower Gwent. At the beginning of 1175, however, violent clashes broke out within the family. Iorwerth's son Hywel blinded and castrated his uncle Owain Pen-Carn, his father's younger brother. From then on, Iorwerth's nephew Morgan, a son of Morgan ab Owain, supported the English who recaptured Caerleon Castle and Lower Gwent. At the end of June 1175, however, Iorwerth concluded an alliance with Lord Rhys, and under his leadership he was one of the princes of southeastern Wales who paid homage to Henry II in Gloucester. This gave him back Caerleon. Presumably this was helped by the fact that Iorwerth's daughter Nest became a lover of Henry II at that time and bore him a son. Nest then married Ralph Bloet, an Anglo-Norman lord from the neighboring lordship of Striguil.

== Family and issue ==
Probably before 1148 Iorwerth married Angharad, a daughter of Bishop Uhtred of Llandaff. He had several children with her, including

- Owain
- Hywel
- Gruffudd
- Cadwallon
- Morgan
- Nest

Iorwerth died between 1175 and 1184, his successor was his son Hywel ab Iorwerth. Either he or his son Hywel founded the Cistercian Llantarnam Abbey between 1175 and 1179.

== Sources ==
"Iorwerth ab Owain (d. 1175x84)". Oxford Dictionary of National Biography (online ed.). Oxford University Press. doi:10.1093/ref:odnb/101048555. (Subscription or UK public library membership required.)
