= Battle of Crug Mawr =

Battle in 1136 in Wales

- Part of the Norman invasion of Wales
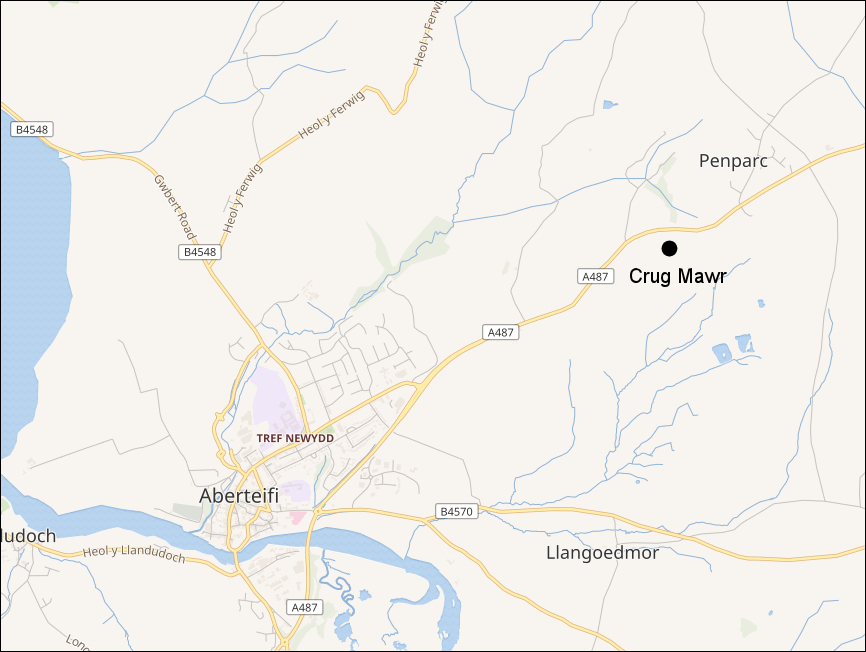
- The location of the battle, two miles from Aberteifi (Cardigan)
Date	10 October 1136
Location	Banc-y-Warren, Ceredigion 52.096°N 4.621°W
Result	Welsh victory

Belligerents
Kingdom of Gwynedd; Kingdom of Deheubarth	Norman and Flemish forces from all the south Wales lordships Kingdom of England

Commanders and leaders
Owain Gwynedd; Cadwaladr ap Gruffydd; Gruffydd ap Rhys	Robert FitzMartin; Robert FitzStephen; Maurice FitzGerald

Strength
4,000 infantrymen 2,000 cavalrymen	Described as "substantial"

The Battle of Crug Mawr (Welsh: Brwydr Crug Mawr), sometimes referred to as the Battle of Cardigan, took place in September or October 1136, as part of a struggle between the Welsh and Anglo-Normans for control of Ceredigion, West Wales.

The battle was fought near Penparc, northeast of Cardigan, probably on the hill now known as Banc-y-Warren; it resulted in a rout of the Norman forces, setting back their expansion in West Wales for some years.

== Background ==
A Welsh revolt against Norman rule had begun in South Wales, where on 1 January 1136 the Welsh won a victory over the local Norman forces at the Battle of Llwchwr between Loughor and Swansea, killing about 500 of their opponents. Richard Fitz Gilbert de Clare, the Norman lord of Ceredigion, had been away from his lordship in the early part of the year. Returning to the borders of Wales in April, he ignored warnings of the danger and pressed on towards Ceredigion with a small force. He had not gone far when he was ambushed and killed by the men of Iorwerth ab Owain, grandson of Caradog ap Gruffydd (the penultimate prince of Gwent).

The news of Richard's death led to an invasion by the forces of Gwynedd, led by Owain Gwynedd and Cadwaladr ap Gruffydd, sons of the king of Gwynedd, Gruffudd ap Cynan. They captured a number of castles in northern Ceredigion before returning home to dispose of the plunder. Around Michaelmas (11 October in the Julian Calendar used at the time) they again invaded Ceredigion and made an alliance with Gruffydd ap Rhys of Deheubarth.

The combined Welsh forces headed for the town of Cardigan. The Normans were said to have a substantial force.

== Location ==
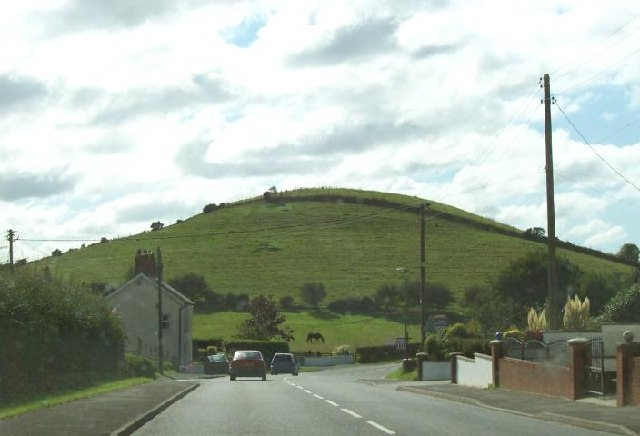
Northeast face of Banc-y-Warren from the A487 road

The exact location of the battlefield is not known. The Royal Commission on the Ancient and Historical Monuments of Wales puts the site of the battle on the southeast slopes of Banc y Warren (or Banc-y-Warren), a prominent conical hill near Penparc, 2 miles (3.2 km) northeast of Cardigan. There is a farm on the southeast slope named Crugmore. A geophysical survey and archaeological appraisal were carried out at Crugmore Farm in 2014 in support of planning applications. No evidence indicative of a battle was found in the areas covered by the surveys. Some accounts place the site on the northeast of the hill, which may be more likely because the road from Cardigan bends round the northeast side of the hill before turning more northerly again. The southeast side of the hill does not coincide with a road. The hill was known as Crug Mawr at least as early as the 9th century.

Gerald of Wales, in his Itinerarium Cambriae of 1191, describes (56 years after the battle):

We proceeded on our journey from Cilgarran towards Pont-Stephen, leaving Cruc Mawr, i.e. the great hill, near Aberteivi, on our left hand. On this spot Gruffydh, son of Rhys ap Theodor, soon after the death of King Henry I, by a furious onset gained a signal victory against the English army...

Members of Gerald's family were participants in the battle.

== Battle ==
The Normans were led by Robert fitz Martin, supported by Robert fitz Stephen, constable of Cardigan Castle, with the brothers William and Maurice FitzGerald, Lord of Lanstephan. After hard fighting, the Norman forces were put to flight and pursued as far as the River Teifi. Many of the fugitives tried to cross the bridge, which broke under the weight. Hundreds are said to have drowned, clogging the river with the bodies of men and horses. Foot soldiers were trampled by horses. Others fled to the town of Cardigan which, however, was taken and burned by the Welsh even though Robert fitz Martin managed to successfully defend the castle. Skulls with battle wounds have been found nearby.

The Breviate Chronicle of 1136 gives a contemporary account of the battle, which notes that the leaders included Owain and Cadwaladr (ap Gruffydd), Gruffydd ap Rhys, Rhys ap Hywel, Madog ab Idnerth and the sons of Hywel on the Welsh side, and Stephen the Constable and the sons of Gerald, supported by Flemish forces, on the Norman side, some travelling a considerable distance to the battle.

Edward Laws quotes Florence of Worcester (vol iii, p. 97):

...the slaughter was so great that besides the male prisoners there were 10,000 widows captured, whose husbands had either been slain in battle, burnt in the town, or drowned in the Teivi. Apparently the whole foreign population had collected at Cardigan for safety. The bridge indeed had been broken down, but the river was so choked with the carcasses of men and horses that folks passed over dry footed.

Florence had died in 1118, so the account was probably penned by his successor, John of Worcester (who died about 1140).

== Hypothesized use of longbows ==
Some modern writers have speculated that the victory was won by longbows. The victory at Crug Mawr took place at a time when the south-eastern Welsh were using longbows as a weapon of war; in 1188, Giraldus Cambrensis noted in his Itinerarium Kambriae that the bowmen of Gwent used long powerful bows, attributing the defeat and death of Richard Fitz Gilbert de Clare to Welsh bowmen earlier in 1136. No contemporary source on the battle mentions bows, or men from Gwent.

It has been argued that despite the Normans' superior numbers and elevated position they were surprised by the range of the Welsh archers, and failed to adapt their tactics or positions. In 2018, the leader of Plaid Cymru, Adam Price suggested that longbows were a feature of the battle, arguing that the Norman threat led the Welsh to innovate a new solution.

== Aftermath ==
The battle was a significant setback to Norman expansion in Wales. Ceredigion, which had been part of Deheubarth before the Normans had conquered it, was now annexed by Gwynedd, the more powerful member of the coalition. Owain Gwynedd became king of Gwynedd on the death of his father the following year and further expanded the borders of his kingdom. In Deheubarth, Gruffydd ap Rhys died in uncertain circumstances in 1137, and the resulting disruption allowed the Normans to partially recover their position in the south. Rhys ap Gruffydd of Deheubarth won it back for his kingdom during the war of 1165–1170.

== See also ==
- Norman conquest of Wales
- History of Wales
