= Rhys ap Rhydderch =

11th-century Welsh brother of Gruffydd ap Rhydderch

- Died: 1052
- Parent: Rhydderch ab Iestyn
- Relatives: brother Gruffydd ap Rhydderch

Rhys ap Rhydderch was the brother of Gruffydd ap Rhydderch, king of Deheubarth from 1044 to 1052. Both were the sons of Rhydderch ab Iestyn, who had been able to take over the Welsh kingdom of Deheubarth from 1023 to 1033.

By 1045, he and his brother had secured control of Morgannwg, and the native chronicles mention that in 1045 the two brothers performed some treacherous action against Gruffydd ap Llywelyn, the king of Gwynedd and Powys. The exact nature of this treachery is not specified, however. Although both Gruffydd ap Llywelyn and the brothers were rivals to rule Deheubarth, in the end, the two brothers became the rulers of the disputed territory. In 1049, Gruffydd ap Rhydderch joined with an Irish and Viking raiding party that raided England. Probably, Rhys was with his brother on this raid into England. The raid was opposed by Ealdred, the Bishop of Worcester, but the English forces were betrayed by Welsh soldiers serving with the English army, and the Welsh and Viking raiders defeated Ealdred's defenders.

King Edward the Confessor of England ordered the killing of Rhys in reprisal for his raiding of England, the decision being made at the royal court held at Christmas, 1052. Rhys was killed, according to the D version of the Anglo-Saxon Chronicle, because he "did harmful things". The chronicle of Florence of Worcester recorded a bit more information, stating that Rhys was killed at "Bulendun", which may be Bullen's Bank near Clyro in Radnorshire.

After his death, Rhys' head was brought to King Edward on 5 January 1053. This left his brother as the only ruler in Deheubarth, but this did not last long, as around 1055, Gruffydd ap Llywelyn attacked the south and killed Gruffydd ap Rhydderch. This left Gruffydd ap Llywelyn as the sole ruler of Wales, the first Welshman to be so.
