= Battle of Llwchwr =

1136 battle of the Norman invasion of Wales

Coordinates: 51.656977°N 4.01019°W

- Part of the Norman invasion of Wales
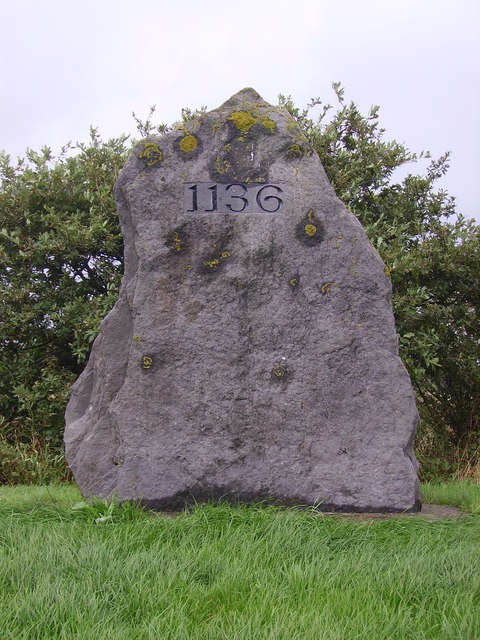
- Commemoration stone of the Battle of Gower
Date	January, 1136
Location	Garngoch
Result	Welsh victory

Belligerents
Welsh forces from Brycheiniog and Northern Gŵyr	Norman forces from Southern Gŵyr

Commanders and leaders
Hywel ap Maredudd	Unknown

Strength
Unknown	Unknown

Casualties and losses
Unknown	500 killed

The Battle of Llwchwr (or Battle of Gower) was fought between Welsh and Norman forces between Loughor and Swansea on New Year's Day 1136.

== Background ==
In 1135–1136 an opportunity arose for the Welsh to recover lands lost to the Marcher lords after Stephen de Blois had displaced his cousin Matilda of England from succeeding her father to the English throne the previous year, sparking the Anarchy in England.

== The battle ==
A Welsh army was raised by the lord of Brycheiniog (Brecknockshire), Hywel ap Maredudd, containing men from Brycheiniog as well as men from Northern Gŵyr that despised the Norman rule in Southern Gŵyr. The Normans sallied out expecting to meet a small collection of Welsh raiding bands, however the scale of the Welsh army took them by surprise. The two armies met on the common of Carn Coch. In a violent melee, the Welsh army emerged victorious, the Normans having lost around 500 men.

== Aftermath ==
The victory of the Welsh army inspired more rebellions around Wales including a battle near Kidwelly Castle fought by an army led by Gwenllian, Princess of Deheubarth and the Battle of Crug Mawr.

== External References ==
– I'R GAD: Welsh Medieval Battlefields Campaign.
