= Uhtred (bishop of Llandaff) =

Welsh clergyman

Uhtred (also Uchtryd or Uchtredus) (d. before 14 March 1148) was a Welsh clergyman. From 1140 to 1148 he was Bishop of Llandaff.

== Rise to the bishop of Llandaff ==
Uhtred's family origins are unknown. The name spelt "Uhtred" is a northern English name, but whether Bishop Uhtred was an Anglo-Saxon is not certain, and it is also possible he was a Welshman named Uchtred. His name was mentioned for the first time in 1126 when archdeacon Uchtredus of Llandaff testified in Woodstock about an agreement between Bishop Urban of Llandaff and Earl Robert of Gloucester. In 1131 and 1134 Uchtredus accompanied Bishop Urban on his travels to Rome. After almost six years of vacancy in the diocese of Llandaff, Uhtred became the new bishop in 1140. He was probably named bishop by King Stephen; otherwise Archbishop of Canterbury Theobald would not have ordained him bishop. However, during the war over the succession to the English throne known as the Anarchy, the area of the diocese of Llandaff fell under the control of Robert, Earl of Gloucester, who was one of the most important allies of King Stephen's opponent Empress Matilda. Because of this, Uhtred found himself in Robert of Gloucester's camp.

== Activity as the bishop ==
It is possible that Uhtred belonged to a claswr, one of native Welsh families in which clerical appointments were passed down from generation to generation even after the Norman conquest of Wales and who still shaped the church in South Wales in the 12th century. Like many other Welsh clergymen of his day, Uhtred was married and had children, which was criticized by reform-minded clergy. According to the chronicler Gerald of Wales, Uhtred was poorly educated and shamed the office of bishop, although this information is not impartial due to the rivalry between the Diocese of St David's (an appointment to which Gerald of Wales coveted all his life) and the Diocese of Llandaff at the time. But it is known that Uhtred was suspended by Archbishop Theobald for a period of time. In addition, he had frequent quarrels with Gilbert Foliot, the abbot of Gloucester Abbey, who vigorously defended the interests of his abbey in Wales. On the other hand, Foliot repeatedly affirmed his friendship with Uhtred and occasionally asked him for assistance. Uhtred himself also asserted his rights as a bishop. He improved the administration of his diocese and appointed a Welsh clergyman as dean of Gwent to strengthen his authority as bishop. Furthermore, he kept his good relationship with Robert, Earl of Gloucester. Uhtred strengthened his position by marrying his daughter Angharad to Iorwerth, the brother of King Morgan ab Owain of Caerleon. After Uhtred's death, his son Robert tried in vain to enforce his inheritance claim to the diocese of Llandaff against the newly appointed bishop Nicholas ap Gwrgan.

== Sources ==
- Crouch, David. "Uthred [Uchtryd, Uchtredus] (d. 1148)". Oxford Dictionary of National Biography (online ed.). Oxford University Press. doi:10.1093/ref:odnb/27971. (Subscription, Wikipedia Library access or UK public library membership required.)
