= Monarchy of Britain =

The Monarchy of Britain may refer to:

- The Monarchy of the United Kingdom
- Unbennaeth Prydain ('The Monarchy of Britain'), the medieval Welsh poem and anthem sung before battle
