= Anarawd =

The name Anarawd may refer to:

- Anarawd ap Rhodri (died 916), King of Gwynedd
- Anarawd ap Gruffydd (died 1143), prince of Deheubarth in south-west Wales
