= Morgan ab Owain =

Morgan ab Owain (died 1158) was a Welsh king and Lord of Caerleon. He was a son of Owain Wan and thus a grandson of Caradog ap Gruffydd, the last Welsh king of Gwent.

After Caradog ap Gruffydd was killed in 1081 in the Battle of Mynydd Carn against Rhys ap Tewdwr, his son Owain Wan ruled only over Gwynllŵg. Most of Gwent was conquered by the Anglo-Norman lord Robert Fitzhamon in the following years.

In 1136 Morgan together with his brother Iorwerth murdered Richard FitzGilbert de Clare, the Anglo-Norman lord of Ceredigion, in an ambush during the Welsh revolt after the death of King Henry I. He then captured Caerleon and Usk Castle, thus gaining control of Upper Gwent and Llenfennydd. Although he only ruled over a small territory, he called himself king from that point. Since the neighboring Norman Marcher Lords were themselves involved in the English civil war after the death of Henry I, he was able to hold on to his conquests. In addition, he secured himself through agreements with Robert, Earl of Gloucester and, after his death, with Roger Fitzmiles, 2nd Earl of Hereford. He and his warriors fought several times as mercenaries in the service of Robert of Gloucester and Roger FitzMiles on the side of Empress Matilda, including "as a terrible Welsh mob" together with Cadwaladr ap Gruffydd of Gwynedd and Madog ap Maredudd of Powys in the Battle of Lincoln. In 1154 he was finally recognized by Henry II as Lord of Caerleon, but in 1158 he and his court poet Gwrgant ap Rhys were murdered in a raid north of Caerphilly by Ifor Bach, the Welsh lord of Senghenydd. Although Morgan left at least two sons, Morgan and Hywel, he was succeeded by his brother Iorwerth ab Owain.
