= Triffyn ap Rhain =

King of Dyfed

Triffyn son of Rhain (Welsh: Triffyn ap Rhain; died c. 814) was an 8th- and 9th-century king of Dyfed.

He was the son of Rhain ap Maredudd. On the death of his father, Triffyn did not succeed him—instead, his uncle Owain did. After Triffyn succeeded Owain, nothing is known about the realm of Dyfed before Hyfaidd went to Alfred the Great in the 880s to request help opposing Rhodri the Great's younger son Cadell. It's possible the kingdom—crushed by Coenwulf of Mercia around 818—fell under the control of the Vikings.

Traditional genealogies report that from Triffyn descends, in the male-line, Cadifor ap Collwyn (aka Cedifor/Cadivor ap Gollwyn/Colhoyn), a Lord of Dyfed within Rhys ap Tewdwr's Deheubarth. When Cadifor died, his sons revolted against Rhys, which destabilised his kingdom, setting the scene for the Norman Conquest of South Wales; legends reported in the 16th century (e.g. by John Leland) claim that Cadifor had a brother - Einion ap Collwyn, who was instrumental in the Norman Conquest of Glamorgan.
