= Goronwy (name) =

Goronwy is a Welsh masculine given name derived from the mythological figure Gronw Pebr. Notable people with the name include:

- Goronwy ab Ednyfed, founder of the Tudors of Penmynydd and seneschal to Llywelyn ap Gruffudd
- Goronwy ap Tudur Hen (d. 1331), Welsh aristocrat and Lord of Penmynydd
- Goronwy Daniel, Welsh academic and civil servant
- Goronwy Edwards, Welsh historian
- Goronwy Foel, Welsh poet
- Goronwy Owen (poet), Welsh poet
- Goronwy Owen (politician), Welsh politician and businessman
- Goronwy Rees, Welsh journalist, academic and writer
- Goronwy Roberts, Baron Goronwy-Roberts, Welsh politician

== See also ==
- James Goronwy Mathias (Goronwy Ddu), Welsh Baptist minister and writer
- Trefor Goronwy, English singer and musician
