= Owain ap Maredudd =

Owain ap Maredudd ("Owen son of Meredith") is a Welsh name that may refer to:

- Owain ap Maredudd (Dyfed) (Owain ap Maredudd ap Tewdwr ap Rhain; fl. 9th century), a king of Dyfed
- Owen Tudor (Owain ap Maredudd ap Tewdwr ap Goronwy; died 1461), founder of England's Tudor Dynasty
