= Nest Bloet =

Welsh noblewoman

Nest Bloet (died 1224/5), sometimes called "Nest of Wales", was a Welsh noblewoman, best known for her many romantic liaisons, including an extramarital affair with King Henry II of England. She was the daughter of Angharad, daughter of Uthred, Bishop of Llandaff, and Iorwerth ab Owain, the lord of Caerleon.

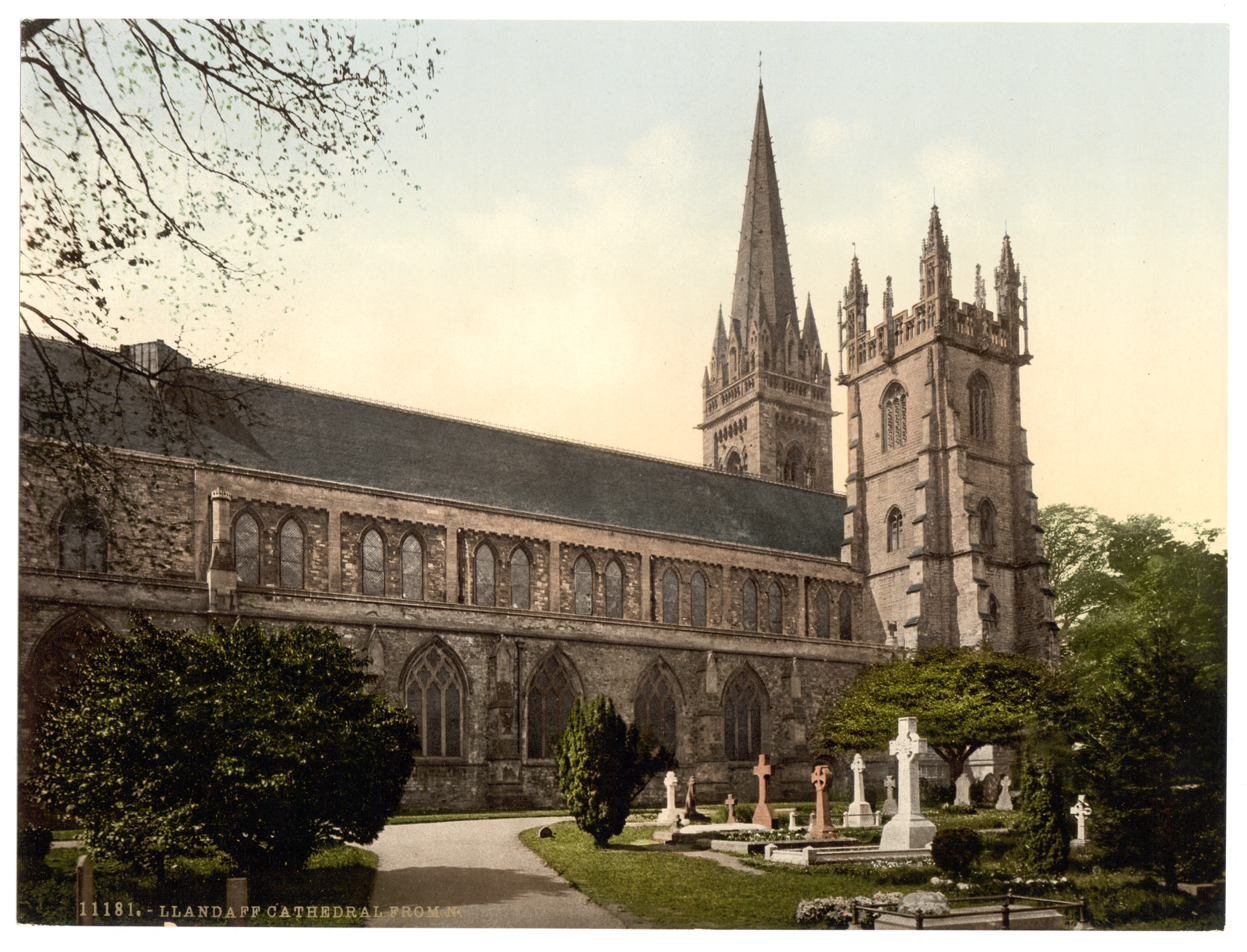
Llandaff Cathedral

== Marriage and Relationship with Henry II ==
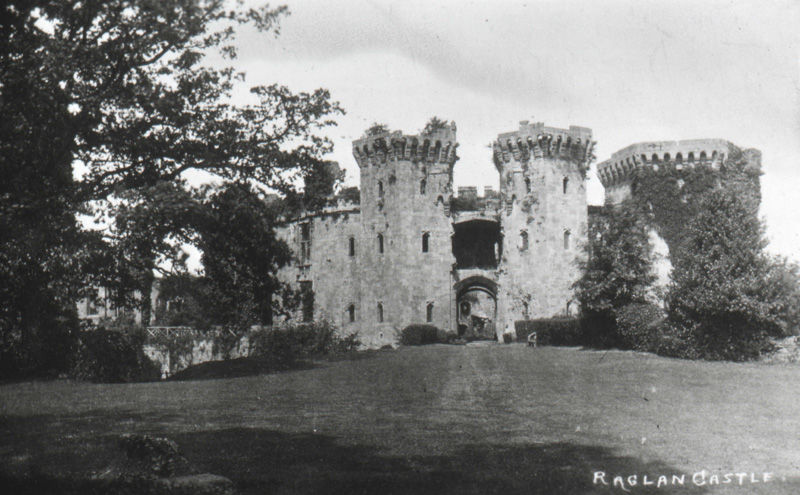
Raglan castle

She married Ralph Bloet III (d.1199) of the Marcher Lordship of Striguil (centred at Chepstow) before 1175. Ralph III was son of Ralph II, son of Ralph I, son of Walter Bloet, who was rewarded for his services with the vill of Raglan by Richard de Clare (Strongbow) c.1171, making the family significant landowners in the marches of south-east Wales and in south-west England. The match between Nest and Ralph therefore linked neighbouring Welsh and marcher elite families.

Nest is most famous for her affair with King Henry II. This affair probably took place in the early or mid 1170s. She may have met the king when he came to meet with a number of Welsh lords at Gloucester in 1175 and restored Caerleon to her father, although Henry and Iorweth also met one another three years earlier.

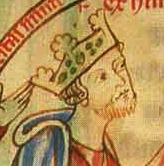
Henry II

This affair produced a son, Morgan, who was raised by Ralph and Nest but acknowledged by Henry II. He became provost of Beverley and later bishop-elect of Durham, but encountered difficulty when Pope Innocent III refused to confirm in the position because of his illegitimacy. Innocent suggested that he could claim Ralph instead of Henry as a father, since Nest and Henry's affair was conducted after her marriage to Ralph, but Morgan refused and did not take his place as bishop.

== Offspring ==
In addition to Morgan, Nest had four sons and a daughter by her husband Ralph.

- Ralph Bloet (d.1241/2), her eldest son and heir to the Bloet inheritance
- Thomas Bloet (d.1211x15)
- Roland (d.1217)
- William (fl.1261)
- Petronilla, who married Diarmait MacCarthaig, King of Desmond

== Widowhood ==
Nest was widowed in 1199 and used the legal capabilities newly available to her as a widow to conduct litigation against Robert Bloet, her brother-in-law, and Hywel ab Iowerth, her brother. She seems to have enjoyed the patronage of King John and this may have been why these disputes were settled in her favour, leaving her with a substantial dower settlement. John also included several of Nest's sons in his household, and one, Roland, died fighting for John against Morgan ap Hywel of Caerleon, who was his maternal cousin.

Nest died between autumn 1224 and summer 1225 of unknown causes.
