= Maredudd ap Gruffudd =

Welsh prince, of Deheubarth

Maredudd ap Gruffudd (1131–1155) was a prince of the kingdom of Deheubarth in Southwest Wales.

Maredudd was the fifth of six sons of Gruffudd ap Rhys, and the third of four by Gwenllian ferch Gruffudd; he also had two older half-brothers, Anarawd and Cadell, by Gruffudd's first wife. He was only five years old when his mother and brothers Morgan and Maelgwyn were killed at Cydweli (Kidwelly). His father died the following year. At the age of 16 he is recorded helping his half-brother Cadell, now King of Deheubarth, to expel the Normans from Ceredigion. He then successfully defended Carmarthen castle against a Norman assault, hurling down the scaling ladders.

In 1151 he took a prominent part in winning back the northern part of Ceredigion from Gwynedd. The same year Cadell was attacked by a force of Normans while out hunting and left for dead. He survived, but was so badly injured that the effective rule of Deheubarth fell on Maredudd. In 1153 Cadell left on a pilgrimage to Rome, leaving Maredudd as King of Deheubarth.

Maredudd died two years later in 1155, leaving the throne of Deheubarth to his younger brother Rhys, later known as The Lord Rhys.

Preceded by Cadell ap Gruffudd	King of Deheubarth; 1153–1155	Succeeded by Rhys ap Gruffudd
