= Einion ab Anarawd =

Son of Anarawd ap Gruffydd

Einion ab Anarawd (c.1130–1163) was the son of Anarawd ap Gruffydd.

== Early life ==
Einion was born around 1130 AD in Carmarthenshire, Wales. He was Christened of the tribe Rhys ap Tewdwr. His mother is Margred ferch Cadwaladr.

== Adulthood ==
Rhys ap Gruffydd was the uncle of Einion. Einion aided King Henry II of England in 1158 in taking and destroying all the castles of Caredigion, gaining much in spoils of war. He was the captain of the king's bodyguard and the leader of the procession that raided the castles.

Einion was the father of Anarawd ab Einion (abt. 1150-1198), Madog ab Einion (abt. 1150 - 1193), and Hywel ab Einion (abt. 1150-1193).

== Death ==
Einion was killed in 1163 by orders of Roger de Clare, 2nd Earl of Hertford. He was killed by one of his servants while sleeping. His murderer was Walter de Clifford.

== Bibliography ==
- Ashley, Mike (2012). The Mammoth Book of British Kings and Queens. Constable & Robinson Limited. ISBN 978-1-4721-0113-6.
- Barbier, Paul (1908). The Age of Owain Gwynedd: An Attempt at a Connected Account of the History of Wales from December, 1135, to November, 1170. To which are Added Several Appendices on the Chronology, &c., of the Period. D. Nutt.
- British Museum, Thomas Jones (1971). Brenhinedd y Saesson: or, The King of the Saxons: BM Cotton MS Cleopatra B v, and The black book of Basingwerk, NLW MS. 7006. University of Wales Press. ISBN 9780900768873.
- Davies, R. R. (2000). The Age of Conquest. Oxford University Press. ISBN 0198208782.
- Evans, John (1901). A Popular History of the Ancient Britons Or the Welsh People: From the Earliest Times to the End of the Nineteenth Century. Elliot Stock.
- Jones, Owen (1870). The Myvyrian archaiology of Wales: collected out of ancient manuscripts. By Owen Jones (Myvyr), Edward Williams (Iolo Morganwg), William Owen Pughe (Idrison). To which has been added additional notes upon the "Gododin," and an English translation of the laws of Howell the Good: also, an explanatory chapter on ancient British music, by John Thomas (Pencerdd Gwalia) (in Welsh).
- Llwyd, Humphrey (2002). Cronica Walliae. University of Wales Press. ISBN 978-0-7083-1638-2.
- Moore, David (2005). The Welsh wars of independence, c. 410-c. 1415. Tempus. ISBN 978-0-7524-3321-9.
- National Library of Wales (1952). Brut y tywysogyon: or, The chronicle of the princes. Peniarth ms. 20 version. University of Wales Press. ISBN 9780708301036.
- Spurrell, William (1882). A guide to Carmarthen and its neighbourhood. Carmarthen.
- Turvey, Roger (2002). The Welsh princes: the native rulers of Wales, 1063-1283. Longman. ISBN 978-0-582-30811-4.
- Williams, Jane (1869). A history of Wales, derived from authentic sources. London: Longmans, Green, and Co. p. 252.
- Woodward, Bernard Bolingbroke (1859). History of Wales.
