= Cadell ap Gruffudd =

Prince of Deheubarth (died 1175)

Cadell ap Gruffudd (died 1175) was prince of the Kingdom of Deheubarth in Southwest Wales.

Cadell was the son of Gruffudd ap Rhys, who held part of the Kingdom of Deheubarth with the remainder in the hands of various Norman lords. Gruffudd died in 1137 and Cadell's brother Anarawd ap Gruffudd took over the throne. Cadell first appears in the historical records the following year, when he helped his brother Anarawd and Owain Gwynedd of Gwynedd and his brother Cadwaladr ap Gruffudd in an assault on Cardigan Castle.

In 1143 Anarawd was murdered by Cadwaladr's men, and Cadell took over as prince of Deheubarth, continuing the work Anarawd had started to win back the remainder of his grandfather's kingdom. In 1146 he captured the castles of Carmarthen (repairing and retaining it for several years) and Llanstephan. In the following year he defeated Walter Fitzwiz. In 1150 he turned north and reclaimed southern Ceredigion, which had been held for Gwynedd by Hywel ab Owain Gwynedd.

Cadell's career was effectively ended in 1150. When out hunting, he was attacked by a Norman force from Tenby, who left him assuming him to be dead. In fact he survived, but was so badly injured as to be unable to resume his activities. In 1153 he left on a pilgrimage to Rome, leaving the rule of Deheubarth to his younger brothers Maredudd and Rhys. Cadell is not heard of again until 1175, when he entered the abbey of Strata Florida after a long illness and died there.

Preceded by Anarawd ap Gruffudd	Prince of Deheubarth; 1143–1153	Succeeded by Maredudd ap Gruffudd
