= Penparc =

Village in Ceredigion, Wales

Coordinates: 52.101866°N 4.612508°W

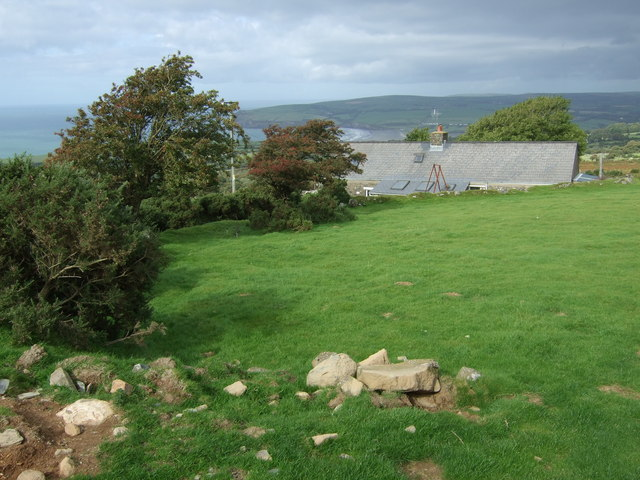
- Penparc

- Location within Ceredigion
- OS grid reference: SN21175 47973
- Principal area: Ceredigion
- Country: Wales
- Sovereign state: United Kingdom
- Post town: Cardigan
- Postcode district: SA43
- Police: Dyfed-Powys
- Fire: Mid and West Wales
- Ambulance: Welsh
- UK Parliament: Ceredigion Preseli

Penparc (also known as Penyparc) is a village in Ceredigion, Wales, on the A487 road 3 miles (4.8 km) northeast of Cardigan.

The surrounding land is principally used for cattle grazing although the significant glacial sand deposits are also commercially used as a source of sand and gravel.

To the east of the village, near a prominent conical hill, is the site of the Battle of Crug Mawr, fought in 1136.
