= Ceiniog =

Basic currency of the medieval Welsh kingdoms

The ceiniog (Latin: denarius; English: penny; plural: ceiniogau; prob. from cant, "circle") was the basic currency of the medieval Welsh kingdoms such as Gwynedd and Deheubarth. Hywel Dda was the only ruler recorded as minting his own proper coins; however, the ceiniog was not a coin but a value of silver. The "legal penny" (Latin: denarius legalis; Welsh: ceiniog cyfreith) was the weight of 32 wheat grains in silver; the "curt penny" (Welsh: ceiniog cwta), the weight of 24 wheat grains. The latter was based on the old Roman pound; the former, Charlemagne's and Offa's. The Welsh half-penny was the dymey of 12 wheat grains (roughly one-third the "legal penny") and the farthing (quarter-penny) was the firdlyc of 6.

Since the value in ceiniogau of most common goods and animals were regulated by the Laws of Hywel Dda, the system also simplified barter in Wales.
