= Seisyll ap Dyfnwal =

12th-century Welsh Lord of Gwent Uwchcoed

Seisyll ap Dyfnwal was a 12th-century Welsh Lord of Gwent Uwchcoed (Upper Gwent).

== Family and estates ==
Seisyll was the son of Dyfnwal ap Caradog ap Ynyr Fychan and his wife, said to have been Joyce daughter of Hamelin de Balun. He was a brother-in-law of Rhys ap Gruffydd, the Lord Rhys, King of Deheubarth.

He held lands in present-day Monmouthshire, part of the old Welsh Kingdom of Gwent, and his main base was at Castell Arnallt, a motte and bailey style fortified site situated near the River Usk a few miles south of Abergavenny, near modern-day Llanover. It is today just a mound in a riverside field.

== Christmas massacre ==
Seisyll ap Dyfnwal is best known for being an unwitting victim of the Norman Baron, William de Braose, 4th Lord of Bramber, who had him killed on or very near Christmas Day 1175 at Abergavenny Castle.

Seisyll, his eldest son Geoffrey, along with other Welsh princes and leaders from the area, were invited to Abergavenny Castle for a banquet by de Braose under a pretext of communication. During the banquet, de Braose announced that a new order had come from the king, which stated that no one was to travel armed anymore. He insisted on the Welsh taking an oath to abide by this. When the Welsh refused, de Braose used this as a pretext to have his men, who were lying in wait, kill everyone present. Since they were eating, none of the Welsh were armed.

De Braose and his men then mounted horses and galloped the few miles to Seisyll's home where they killed his seven-year-old younger son, Cadwalladr, and captured his wife, whose exact fate is uncertain.

De Braose's act was to avenge his own uncle's death. His uncle, Henry FitzMiles, was believed to have been killed by Seisyll or other Welsh around Easter of that year.

== Legacy ==
De Braose earned the nickname the 'Ogre of Abergavenny' for his conduct and his follow-up retribution on his enemy's families. Seisyll's death was avenged in 1182 or 1184 by Hywel ap Iorwerth, the Welsh lord of Caerleon, in a campaign in which the sheriff of Hereford, Randulph de Poer, was killed, Abergavenny castle stormed and another castle, Dingestow Castle, destroyed. De Braose later fell from royal favour, dying in exile.
