= Castell Meredydd =

Ruined C13 castle in Gwynllwg, Wales

- Newport, South Wales, Wales; Near Machen in Wales

Site information
- Type: Castle
- Condition: Ruined

Location
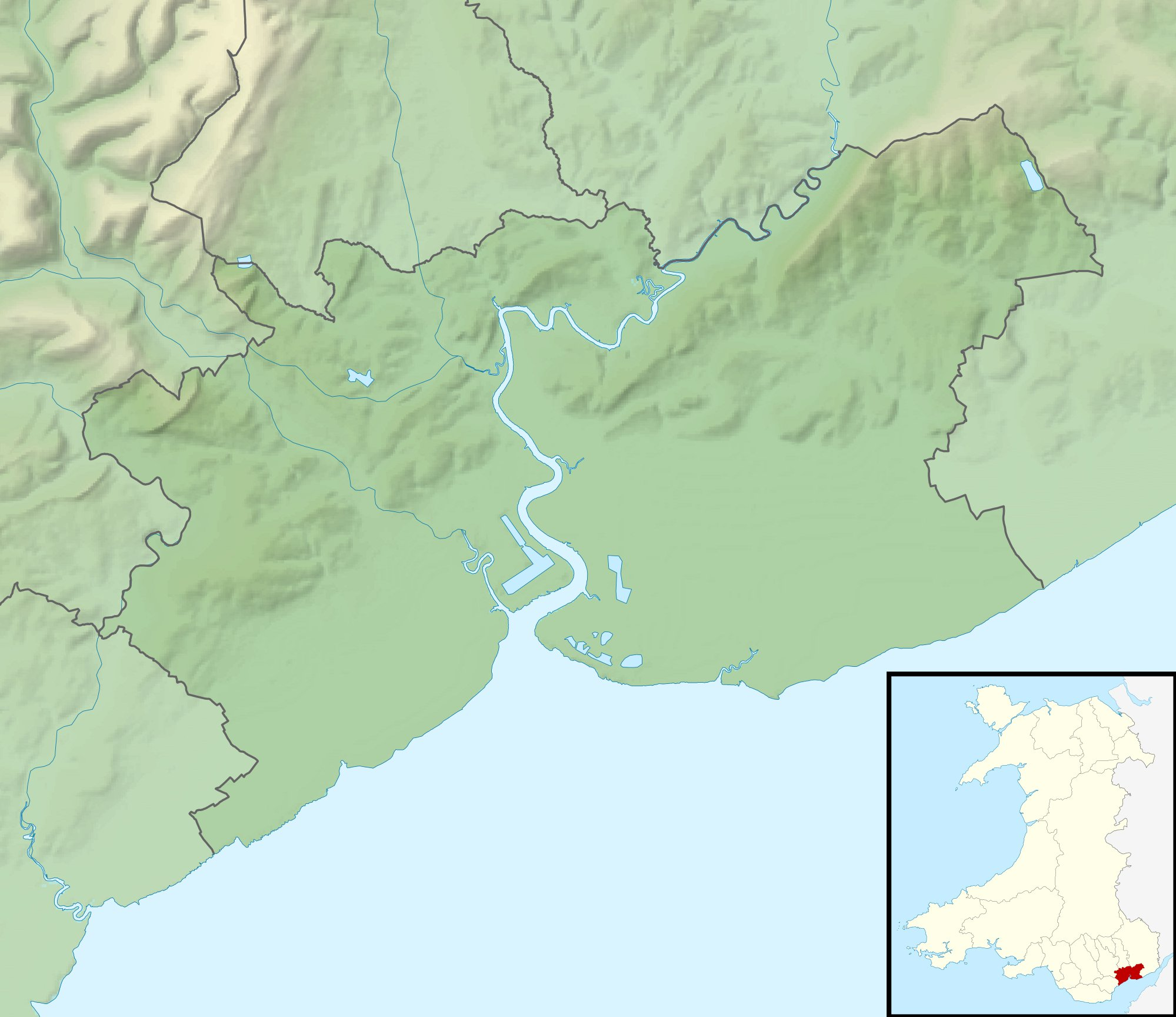
- Coordinates: 51.591993°N 3.119780°W

Castell Meredydd, also called Castell Machen, was a castle in Gwynllwg, Wales in the 13th century, long since ruined.

== Location ==
The ruined castle, which is also called Machen, Maghay or Maghhay in historical documents, is in the community of Graig in the historic county of Monmouthshire and the modern authority of Newport. It has been described both as a timber castle and as a masonry castle. There are remains of masonry footings. The site is protected as a scheduled monument.

== Fortification ==
Castell Meredydd is set on a ledge on a south-facing hillside. The castle consisted of a round tower about 10 metres (33 ft) in diameter with walls about 2 metres (6 ft 7 in) thick, and another large building about 18 by 10 metres (59 by 33 ft) on two natural rocky mounds on the south side of an enclosure about 56 metres (184 ft) from east to west, and 30 to 56 metres (98 to 184 ft) from north to south. There was a latrine chute discharging from the tower keep down the cliff to the south. The knolls on which the keep and the hall stood are separated from the large bailey to the north by a ditch. The 60 metres (200 ft) square bailey was overlooked by higher ground to the north, and despite the wall and ditch was not well defended.

== History ==
The outcrop on which the castle stands was first fortified in the late 12th century by Meredydd Gethin. Morgan ap Hywel, who succeeded his father Hywel as Lord of Gwynllwg around 1215, lost Caerleon in October 1217 to the forces of William Marshal, 1st Earl of Pembroke (1146–1219), lord of Striguil. However, Morgan managed to retain Castell Machen for most of his life. Morgan strengthened it by the addition of a tower. He probably built the round tower, or keep, in 1217. Gilbert Marshal captured Castell Meredydd in 1236 during a truce between Llywelyn the Great and King Henry III of England. After Marshal took the castle he seems to have fortified it with a bailey and curtain wall. He was forced to return it to Morgan by the terms of the truce, or "for fear of the lord Llywelyn".

Morgan died not long before 15 March 1248. He was succeeded by his grandson Meredudd ap Gruffudd (died 1270), son of his daughter Gwerful and of Gryffudd ap Maredud, a grandson of Lord Rhys. Meredudd inherited the castle. Gilbert de Clare, 7th Earl of Gloucester and lord of Glamorgan, took the castle in 1266 when he overran Senghenydd. The castle is listed as property of the last earl in 1314, and then is no longer mentioned in the records.

== Sources ==
- Breverton, Terry (2013-08-22), Wales' 1000 Best Heritage Sites, Amberley Publishing Limited, ISBN 978-1-4456-2013-8
- Davis, Paul R. (2011-03-08), Castles of the Welsh Princes, Y Lolfa, ISBN 978-0-86243-970-5
- Jenkins, Robert Thomas (1959), "MORGAN ap HYWEL", Dictionary of Welsh Biography, Honourable Society of Cymmrodorion
- Newman, John (2000-03-01), Gwent/Monmouthshire, Yale University Press, ISBN 978-0-300-09630-9
- Pettifer, Adrian (2000), Welsh Castles: A Guide by Counties, Boydell & Brewer, ISBN 978-0-85115-778-8
- Pryce, Huw; Insley, Charles (2010-10-01), The Acts of Welsh Rulers: 1120–1283, University of Wales Press, ISBN 978-0-7083-2387-8
