= Morgan (bishop) =

13th-century Bishop of Durham-elect

- Bishop-elect of Durham
- Appointed: between 7 March and 7 May 1215
- Quashed: after 1215
- Predecessor: John de Gray
- Successor: Richard Marsh
- Other post: Provost of Beverley

Personal details
- Denomination: Catholic

Morgan was a medieval Bishop-elect of Durham.

Morgan was an illegitimate son of King Henry II of England and his mistress Nesta, daughter of Iorwerth ab Owain, Lord of Caerleon. Nesta was married to Sir Ralph Bloet, who raised Morgan as his son. The date of his birth is unknown but presumed to be toward the end of King Henry's life.

Morgan was the provost of Beverley before being nominated to the see of Durham between 7 March and 7 May 1215. He was never consecrated because Pope Innocent III refused consecration on the grounds of his illegitimacy. Innocent offered to confirm the election and allow the episcopal consecration if Morgan would swear that he was the son of Nesta and her husband Ralph and not King Henry. Morgan, after deliberation, replied that it was unthinkable for him to deny his father the king.

After his accession to the throne of England, John, Morgan's half-brother, was known to be generous to the entire Bloet family.

== Citations ==
Catholic Church titles
Preceded by John de Gray	Bishop of Durham election quashed 1215	Succeeded by Richard Marsh
