= Banc-y-Warren =

Protected area in Ceredigion, Wales

Coordinates: 52.096949°N 4.622995°W

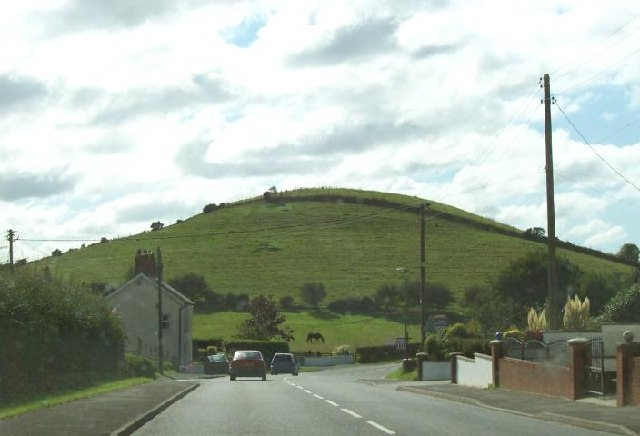
Banc-y-Warren in 2005

Banc-y-Warren is hill in Ceredigion with a height of 146 m. It is also classed as a Site of Special Scientific Interest.

== See also ==
- List of Sites of Special Scientific Interest in Ceredigion
