= Goronwy Foel =

Welsh language court poet

Goronwy Foel (fl. about the middle of the 13th century) was a Welsh language court poet from Deheubarth, south-west Wales.
