= Maredudd ap Tewdws =

King of Dyfed (died c. 797)

Maredudd ap Tewdws (English: Meredith son of Theodosius; died c. 797) was a king of Dyfed in South Wales.

His father was Tewdws son of Rhain ap Cadwgan. His sons, who both reigned after him, were Rhain and Owain.

His lineage is included among the Harleian Genealogies. His death was recorded in the Annals of Wales. The entry is undated, but Phillimore's reconstruction places it in AD 797.
