= Rhain ap Maredudd =

King of Dyfed (died c. 808)

Rhain son of Maredudd (Welsh: Rhain ap Maredudd; died c. 808) was a king of Dyfed. He ruled following his father Maredudd ap Tewdws and was succeeded by his brother Owain. His son Triffyn then succeeded Owain.

His lineage is included among the Harleian Genealogies. His death was recorded in the Annals of Wales. The entry is undated, but Phillimore's reconstruction places it in AD 808.
