= Rhys ab Owain =

King of Deheubarth (died 1078)

Rhys ab Owain (died 1078) was a king of Deheubarth in southern Wales.

Rhys was the son of Owain ab Edwin of the line of Hywel Dda, and member of the Dinefwr dynasty. His ancestry was formally traced in his name Owain ab Edwin ab Einion ab Owain ap Hywel Dda. He followed his brother Maredudd as king of Deheubarth in 1072. Together with the nobility of Ystrad Tywi, he was implicated in the killing of Bleddyn ap Cynfyn king of Gwynedd and Powys in 1075.

In 1078 he was defeated by Trahaearn ap Caradog, who had followed Bleddyn on the throne of Gwynedd, in a battle at Gwdig (modern day Goodwick). Later the same year Rhys was killed by Caradog ap Gruffydd of Gwent. His defeat and death were hailed in the annals as "vengeance for the blood of Bleddyn ap Cynfyn".

Rhys was followed as king of Deheubarth by his second cousin, Rhys ap Tewdwr.

Regnal titles
Preceded by Maredudd ab Owain	Prince of Deheubarth; 1072–1078	Succeeded by Rhys ap Tewdwr
