= Trahaearn ap Caradog =

11th-century King of Gwynedd

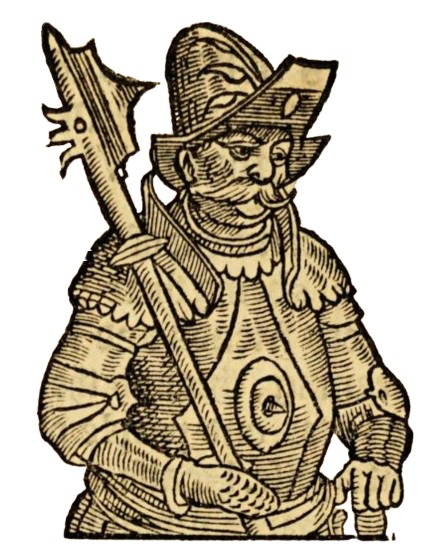
- A fanciful illustration of Trahaearn ap Caradog from the Historie of Cambria (1584)

King of Gwynedd
- Reign: c. 1075 - 1081
- Born: 1044
- Died: 1081 (aged 36–37)
- House: House of Mathrafal
- Father: Caradog ap Gwyn ap Collwyn

Trahaearn ap Caradog (1044–1081) was a King of Gwynedd. Trahaearn was a son of Caradog ap Gwyn, ruler of Arwystli (in the south of present-day Montgomeryshire, Wales), a small state, on the south-western border between Gwynedd and Powys. He was born in 1044 in Arwystli, and died in 1081 in Mynydd Carn in Pembrokeshire, at the Battle of Mynydd Carn.

== Accession to the throne of Gwynedd ==
On the death of Bleddyn ap Cynfyn in 1075, it appears that none of his sons were old enough to claim the throne, and Bleddyn's cousin Trahaearn ap Caradog, seized power.

The same year Gruffudd ap Cynan landed on Anglesey with an Irish force and, with the assistance of the Norman Robert of Rhuddlan, defeated Trahaearn at the Battle of Gwaed Erw in Meirionnydd, gaining control of Gwynedd. However tension between Gruffudd ap Cynan's Irish bodyguard and the local Welsh people led to a rebellion in Llŷn and Trahaearn took the opportunity to counterattack, defeating Gruffudd at the Battle of Bron yr Erw at Clynnog Fawr, also in 1075, forcing him to flee back to Ireland.

In 1078 Caradog ap Gruffudd (Prince of the Kingdom of Gwent) killed Rhys ab Owain of Deheubarth, who had been responsible for the killing of Bleddyn ap Cynfyn, in the Battle of Gwdig or Battle of Goodwick. Caradog ap Gruffudd wanted to take control of Deheubarth like his father and grandfather had done. However Rhys ap Tewdwr, Rhys ab Owain's second cousin, meanwhile had become king of Deheubarth. Rhys ap Tewdwr was forced to flee when Caradog ap Gruffudd invaded Deheubarth in 1081. He sought protection in St Davids at the far southwestern corner of his kingdom.

== Downfall and death ==
Gruffudd ap Cynan returned on a second campaign from Ireland with an army of Danes and Irish to become King of Gwynedd. He took his fleet to St Davids and made an alliance with Rhys ap Tewdwr who had recently been ousted as prince of Deheubarth by Caradog ap Gruffudd of Morgannwg. Gruffudd ap Cynan received additional support with backers that came from north Wales. They all agreed to remove Trahaearn ap Caradog from the throne Gwynedd. However, meanwhile, Trahaearn had learned of their plot and secretly formed an alliance with Caradog ap Gruffudd and Meilyr ap Rhiwallon. Trahaearn also obtained Norman arbalesters for additional support for his army. The two enemy armies met at the fierce and bloody Battle of Mynydd Carn north of St Davids. Trahaearn, Caradog and Meilyr were killed. Gruffudd was victorious and became King of Gwynedd. Rhys ap Tewdwr, Gruffudd's ally, once again became King of Deheubarth.

== Sources ==
- R. R. Davies (1991). The age of conquest: Wales 1063–1415. Oxford University Press. ISBN 0-19-820198-2.
- Thomas Jones, ed. (1952) Brut y Tywysogion: Peniarth MS. 20 version (University of Wales Press)
- Powel, David (1584). The historie of Cambria, now called Wales: a part of the most famous Yland of Brytaine, written in the Brytish language aboue two hundreth yeares past. Translated by Llwyd, Humphrey. London: Rafe Newberrie and Henrie Denham. IA historieofcambri00cara.
- "TRAHAEARN ap CARADOG (died 1081), king of Gwynedd". Dictionary of Welsh Biography. National Library of Wales.

Regnal titles
Preceded by Bleddyn ap Cynfyn	King of Gwynedd; 1075–1081	Succeeded by Gruffudd ap Cynan
