= Gruffudd ap Rhys =

Welsh prince (c. 1090 – 1137)

Gruffudd ap Rhys (c. 1090 – 1137) was Prince of Deheubarth, in Wales, and the son of Rhys ap Tewdwr. Gruffudd's sister was the Princess Nest ferch Rhys. He was the father of Rhys ap Gruffudd, known as 'The Lord Rhys', who was one of the most successful rulers of Deheubarth during this period.

== Family ==
Gruffudd had at least two sons prior to marriage to Gwenllian:

- Anarawd (murdered in 1143). He had a son, Einion, who was murdered in his bed in 1163
- Cadell (died 1175)

He married Gwenllian ferch Gruffudd and by her he had issue:

- Morgan (born c. 1116)
- Maelgwyn (born c. 1119)
- Gwladus (born between 1120 and 1130)
- Nest (born between 1120 and 1130)
- Owain ap Gruffudd (born c. 1126)
- Maredudd ap Gruffudd (born c. 1130/1, died 1155)
- Rhys ap Gruffudd (born c. 1132)
- Sion ap Gruffudd (born c. 1134)

== Early life ==
Gruffudd was born in Llandeilo. Following the death of his father Rhys ap Tewdwr in 1093, Deheubarth was taken over by the Normans, and Gruffudd spent much of his early years in exile in Ireland.

In 1113 Gruffudd returned to South Wales, taking two years to gather support around him, after which, in 1115 he was accused by King Henry I of England of stirring up revolt and so went to Gruffudd ap Cynan for help. Gruffudd ap Cynan planned to murder Gruffudd to receive a reward from King Henry I, but Gruffudd's sister Nest warned him and he was able to escape to Llŷn. This was followed by the marriage of Gruffudd ap Rhys to Gwenllian ferch Gruffudd daughter of Gruffudd ap Cynan. The story goes that the two became romantically involved and eloped. She married Gruffudd ap Rhys shortly after 1116.

In 1116 Gruffudd attacked Castle Llanmyddyfri, but was defeated. He also attacked Swansea Castle, and destroyed the outer walls; and captured Carmarthen Castle, and either in this year or in 1114 captured Kidwelly Castle. However an attack on Aberystwyth was defeated and Gruffudd's army dispersed.

In 1122 Gruffudd made peace with King Henry I and was allowed to rule a portion of his father's kingdom, the Cantref Mawr, although he was soon under pressure from the Normans again and was forced to flee to Ireland for a period in 1127.

== Rebellion ==
In 1135 Gruffudd was summoned by King Stephen of England to London, but refused to go. The following year he joined his brothers in law Owain Gwynedd and Cadwaladr, the sons of Gruffudd ap Cynan of Gwynedd, in a rebellion against Norman rule. While Gruffudd was away from home, his wife Gwenllian led her husband's troops against Maurice de Londres, but was defeated, captured, and beheaded. In this battle his son Morgan was also slain, and his son Maelgwn was captured. In revenge for his wife's execution Gruffudd attacked the English and the Fleming residents of South Wales, causing great destruction of property, crops, and livestock. Gruffudd himself with Owain and Cadwaladr gained a crushing victory over the Normans at Crug Mawr near Cardigan the same year. In celebration of driving the English and the Fleming from South Wales, Gruffudd hosted a grand festival that lasted for 40 days.

== Death and succession ==
In early 1137 Gruffudd died in uncertain circumstances. Florence of Worcester claimed that Gruffudd was murdered by his second wife. Of course, this is impossible, since Gwenllian herself had already been executed by the English at Kidwelly Castle.

He was succeeded by his son, Anarawd. Of his other sons, Cadell, Maredydd, and Rhys (later known as The Lord Rhys) all ruled Deheubarth in turn.

== Bibliography ==
- Bartrum, P.C. (1965). "Plant yr Arglwydd Rhys". National Library of Wales Journal. 14: 97–104.
- Bridgeman, George Thomas Orlando (1876). History of the Princes of South Wales. Wigan: Thomas Birch.
- Glenn, Thomas Allen (1913). Welsh Founders of Pennsylvania volume II. Oxford: Fox Jones.
- Pierce, Thomas Jones (1959). "Gruffudd ap RHYS (c. 1090 - 1137), prince of Deheubarth". Dictionary of Welsh Biography. National Library of Wales.
- Pierce, Thomas Jones (1959). "GWENLLIAN (died 1136)". Dictionary of Welsh Biography. National Library of Wales.
- Turvey, Roger (1996). The Lord Rhys: Prince of Deheubarth. Llandysul: Gomer. ISBN 1859024300.
- Turvey, Roger K. (6 June 2014). The Welsh Princes: The Native Rulers of Wales 1063-1283. Routledge. ISBN 978-1-317-88397-5.
- Warner, Philip (2014). Famous Welsh Battles (Kindle ed.). Class Warfare. ISBN 978-1859595206.

Preceded by Rhys ap Tewdwr	King of Deheubarth; 1116–1137	Succeeded by Anarawd ap Gruffudd
