= Hywel ab Edwin =

King of Deheubarth

Hywel ap Edwin (died 1044) was king of Deheubarth in south Wales from 1033 to 1043.

Hywel was the son of Edwin ap Einion and great-grandson of Hywel Dda, law giver and a king of great influence in early medieval Wales. When the previous king of Deheubarth, Rhydderch ap Iestyn, (who had usurped the throne following the 1023 death of Llywelyn ap Seisyll), died in 1033, Hywel became king of Deheubarth, sharing the realm with his brother Maredudd ap Edwin. They were considered the heirs due to their seniority in descent from Hywel Dda. Hywel and Maredudd's rule did not go unchallenged as the sons of Rhydderch fought in a battle against them in 1034 at Irathwy. Though sources do not name the victors, it seems as though Hywel and Maredudd were victorious as they remained in power.

On Maredudd's death in 1035, Hywel became sole king of Deheubarth. He came under increasing pressure from Viking raids and from King Gruffydd ap Llywelyn, son of the previous king of Dehuebarth, Llywelyn ap Seisyll. Gruffydd had already seized the throne of Gwynedd. In 1042 Hywel won a victory over a host of Viking marauders near Carmarthen but that year or in 1043 he was driven out of his kingdom by Gruffydd, who also took Hywel's wife (unnamed) as his own. Hywel returned in 1044 with the aid of an Irish fleet to try to regain his kingdom, but Gruffydd defeated them in the Battle of Pencader near the mouth of the River Towy, in which Hywel was killed.

Hywel ap Edwin's nephew, son of his brother Owain, Maredudd ab Owain ab Edwin, succeeded to the throne when Gruffydd ap Llywelyn died in 1063.

Regnal titles
| Preceded by Rhydderch ab Iestyn | King of Deheubarth; 1033–1043 | Succeeded by Gruffydd ap Rhydderch |
