= Gruffudd ap Rhydderch =

King of Gwent

Gruffudd ap Rhydderch (d. AD 1055) was a king of Gwent and part of the kingdom of Morgannwg in south Wales, and later king of Deheubarth.

Gruffudd was the son of Rhydderch ab Iestyn, who had been able to take over the kingdom of Deheubarth from 1023 to 1033. He received the lordship of Caerleon in 1031 and strengthened its fortifications. Already king of part of Morgannwg, Gruffudd became involved with Deheubarth when that kingdom was taken over from Hywel ab Edwin by Gruffudd ap Llywelyn, already king of Gwynedd, in 1044. Gruffudd ap Rhydderch was, however, able to expel him in 1045 and became king of Deheubarth himself. He was said to be a powerful king who stoutly resisted raids by the Danes and attacks by Gruffudd ap Llywelyn. In 1055, however, Gruffudd ap Llywelyn killed him in battle and recaptured Deheubarth.

In 1049 he is reported raiding up the River Severn in alliance with an Irish Viking fleet.

His son Caradog ap Gruffudd (who received Caerleon in 1057) also attempted to emulate his father and grandfather by gaining control of Deheubarth, but was killed at the Battle of Mynydd Carn.

Regnal titles
Preceded by Rhydderch ab Iestyn	King of Morgannwg; 1033–1055	Succeeded by Gruffudd ap Llywelyn
Preceded by Rhydderch ab Iestyn	Joint King of Glywysing (with Hywel ab Owain ap Morgan Hen); 1033–1043	Succeeded by Merged into the Kingdom of Morgannwg
Preceded by Rhydderch ab Iestyn	Pretender King of Deheubarth; 1033–1045	Succeeded by Recognized as King
Preceded by Hywel ab Edwin	King of Deheubarth; 1045–1055	Succeeded by Gruffudd ap Llywelyn
