= William I's Welsh campaign of 1081 =

William the Conqueror went overland through South Wales in 1081 on an armed pilgrimage to St Davids on the West Coast of Wales. This was part of the Norman conquest of Wales.

English and the Welsh sources differ on the purpose of the visit. The Anglo-Saxon Chronicle states that it was a military campaign, but Welsh sources record it as a pilgrimage to St Davids in honour of Saint David. William's biographer David Bates argues that the former explanation is more likely: the balance of power had recently shifted in Wales and William would have wished to take advantage of this to extend Norman power. By the end of 1081, William was back on the continent, dealing with disturbances in Maine.

On the return he visited Cardiff and may have been responsible for commissioning the building of Cardiff Castle.

== Bibliography ==
- Higham, Robert; Barker, Philip (2004). Timber Castles. Exeter, UK: University of Exeter Press. ISBN 978-0-85989-753-2.
