= Terry Breverton =

British businessman and writer

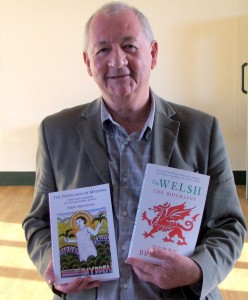
- Terry Breverton with two of his published books,
- Born: 15 June 1946 (age 80)
- Occupation: Author
- Known for: Books on Wales

Terry Breverton FRHistS FRSA FIC FCIM is a former businessman and academic who worked across Europe and in the Middle East. He has presented papers upon transnational tax avoidance effects in Paris, Seattle, Charleston and Thessaloniki.

In 2000 he founded Glyndŵr Publishing to publish books about Welsh history, heritage and culture.

In 2001, 2002, 2003, 2004 and 2005 Breverton was awarded the Books Council of Wales 'Book of the Month Award' for '100 Great Welshmen', 'The Welsh Almanac’, 'The Book of Welsh Pirates and Buccaneers', ‘Admiral Sir Henry Morgan’ and ‘The Pirate Handbook’ respectively, the only writer to have achieved five such awards.

Breverton's suggestion that Elvis Presley had possible Welsh ancestry was covered in UK and foreign media. He has spoken upon economics or history at conferences in Washington, Vancouver, Madrid, Brussels, Los Angeles, Boston etc.

His six books for Quercus have been translated into many languages, and along with over forty others are listed on walesbooks.com

Welsh culture and history has been the main focus of many of his books. He wrote the first biographies of Jasper Tudor and Owain Tudor, Henry VII's uncle and his grandfather.

His An A to Z of Wales and the Welsh featured in national newspapers and he translated from mediaeval Welsh The Physicians of Myddfai - Cures and Remedies of the Medieval World.

Breverton has spoken at the North American Festival of Wales at Vancouver (2003) and at Richmond, Washington DC (2007). He has appeared in many TV documentaries, including flying to Los Angeles for True Caribbean Pirates.

== Sources ==
- Annette Kristynik (21 January 2013), "An Interview with Terry Breverton Author of The Welsh, The Biography", Impressions In Ink
- Ceri Shaw (6 June 2013), "An Interview With Welsh Author, Terry Breverton", americymru.net
- Natalie Grueninger (21 August 2014), 20 Questions with Terry Breverton
