= Anarawd ap Gruffudd =

Prince of Deheubarth (died 1143)

Anarawd ap Gruffudd (died 1143) was a Prince of Deheubarth in Southwest Wales.

== Lineage ==
Anarawd was the eldest son of Gruffudd ap Rhys. On the death of his father in 1137, Anarawd took over the rule of Deheubarth.

== Resistance ==
In 1136 he and his brother Cadell ap Gruffudd joined with the Prince of Gwynedd, Owain Gwynedd and the latter's brother Cadwaladr ap Gruffudd in an assault on Cardigan Castle which was in Norman hands. The assault was aided by a fleet of Viking ships, but an agreement was reached and the siege lifted.

== Dispute with Canterbury ==
In 1140 Anarawd again supported Owain Gwynedd, this time in the dispute with the Archbishop of Canterbury, Theobald of Bec, about the appointment of a Bishop of Bangor.

== Death by treachery ==
However, in 1143 Anarawd was treacherously killed by the men of Owain's brother Cadwaladr. Cadwaladr himself was strongly suspected of having ordered the killing. This greatly angered Owain, for Anarawd had been a key ally and was about to marry Owain's daughter. Owain sent his son Hywel ab Owain Gwynedd to strip Cadwaladr of his lands in Ceredigion in punishment.

== Succession ==
Anarawd was followed on the throne of Deheubarth by his brother Cadell.

His son, Einion ab Anarawd, was killed by his own servant in 1163, apparently on the orders of Roger de Clare, 3rd Earl of Hertford.

== Bibliography ==
- Lloyd, Sir John Edward (1912). A History of Wales from the Earliest Times to the Edwardian Conquest. Longmans, Green.
- Turvey, Roger K. (6 June 2014). The Welsh Princes: The Native Rulers of Wales 1063-1283. Routledge. ISBN 978-1-317-88397-5.

Preceded by Gruffudd ap Rhys	Prince of Deheubarth; 1137–1143	Succeeded by Cadell ap Gruffudd
