= Owain ap Maredudd (Dyfed) =

Welsh sovereign (died c. 810)

Owain son of Maredudd (Welsh: Owain ap Maredudd; died c. 810) was a king of Dyfed who ruled briefly at the beginning of the 9th century between his brother Rhain and his nephew Triffyn. His death was noted by the undated Annals of Wales. Phillimore's reconstruction places the entry at AD 810.

His father was Maredudd ap Tewdws. While no details about Owain's rule are available, it is likely that Dyfed was subject to Viking raids and that he was killed.

== Personal life ==
The genealogies of subsequent kings of Dyfed sometimes include Tangwystl ferch Owain, a daughter of Owain's whose marriage justified the rule of their own dynasty. However, her actual existence is uncertain.
