= Unbennaeth Prydain =

Old Welsh composition

Unbennaeth or Unbeinyaeth Prydein (Welsh for "The Monarchy of Britain") was an Old Welsh composition that served as a kind of national anthem in Wales in the Early Middle Ages. The bards of the royal courts of Aberffraw, Dinefwr, Mathrafal, and Caerleon were required by law to follow the army and recite the song before and after every battle. For this service, he received the next-best beast from the spoils after the king's and was valued at 126 cows.

Although the specific composition is now lost, it presumably recounted the exploits of the former kings of the Britons. In his commentary on the Laws of Hywel Dda, scholar Arthur Wade-Evans stressed that the Prydein mentioned refers to the lands of the British (i.e., the Welsh and their compatriots in Cornwall and Cumberland) and not necessarily to the entire province of Roman Britain, let alone the entire island of Great Britain. It seems likely, however, that the song's accounts were rather closer to the Matter of Britain of the Triads and Geoffrey of Monmouth than to the more pedestrian (if presumably more accurate) records of the early bards like Taliesin.
