= Maredudd ab Owain ab Edwin =

Prince of Deheubarth (died 1072)

Maredudd ab Owain ab Edwin (died 1072) was a prince of the kingdom of Deheubarth in south west Wales, ruling between 1063 and his death in 1072.

Maredudd was the son of Owain ab Edwin and was hence the male-line heir of Hywel Dda. The throne had been seized from the previous king of this line - Hywel ab Edwin - by Gruffydd ap Llywelyn, who claimed the throne through his mother, Angharad. Angharad was the daughter of Maredudd ab Owain ap Hywel, while Hywel claimed the throne through the latter Maredudd's younger brother, Einion (Hywel's grandfather).

Gruffydd had united almost all Wales under his rule, and was the only ruler to be King of Wales, but on Gruffydd's death in 1063 Maredudd reclaimed Deheubarth for his line.

During Maredudd's reign the Normans sacked south-east Wales in response to Welsh support for Saxon revolts like that of Eadric the Wild. After a few attempts to halt this, Maredudd decided not to resist the Norman encroachment on the Kingdom of Gwent and was in return rewarded with lands in England in 1070. In 1072 he was killed in a battle by the river Rhymni. He was succeeded by his brother, Rhys ab Owain, rather than his young son, Gruffydd ap Maredudd.

When Rhys ab Owain died in 1078, the realm was seized by Rhys ap Tewdwr (Maredudd's second cousin, descended from a younger son of Einion). Gruffydd ap Maredudd lived on his father's lands in England for some years during this period, before being killed in battle at Llandudoch (St. Dogmaels) in Pembrokeshire when trying to recapture his father's kingdom from Rhys ap Tewdwr.

Regnal titles
Preceded by Gruffydd ap Llywelyn	Prince of Deheubarth; 1063–1072	Succeeded by Rhys ab Owain
