= Rhydderch ab Iestyn =

Rhydderch ab Iestyn (died 1033) was king of Deheubarth and controlled the Kingdom of Powys in Wales during the early part of the eleventh century.

Comparatively little has been recorded about Rhydderch ab Iestyn in the annals. When Llywelyn ap Seisyll, king of Gwynedd and Deheubarth, died unexpectedly in 1023, Rhydderch was able to seize Deheubarth, apparently by force of arms, disinheriting Llewellyn's young son Gruffudd. In 1033 Rhydderch is recorded by Brut y Tywysogion as having been slain by the Irish, but with no explanation of the circumstances.

The kingdom of Deheubarth returned to the original dynasty in the form of Hywel ab Edwin and his brother Maredudd. A battle between Hywel and his brother and the sons of Rhydderch is recorded the following year. In 1045 Rhydderch's son Gruffudd ap Rhydderch was able to seize Deheubarth from Gruffudd ap Llywelyn, (later King of Wales between 1055–1063) and he held it for ten years until Gruffudd regained it.

Rhydderch had at least recorded three sons. Gruffudd ap Rhydderch (died 1055) was King of Morgannwg and Deheubarth, and was killed in battle against Gruffudd ap Llywelyn, son of Llywelyn ap Seisyll. Caradog ap Rhydderch (died 1035) was killed by the "Saxons". Rhys ap Rhydderch (died 5 January 1053) was put to death at Bulendun (possibly Bullen's Bank near Clyro, Radnorshire), by order of King Edward the Confessor as punishment for his raiding into England. Rhys's head was brought to King Edward on 5 January 1053 at the royal court in Gloucester.

== Sources ==
- Peter Bartrum A Welsh Classical Dictionary, People in History and Legend up to about A.D. 1000 (Aberystwyth NLW 2009 Ed) p. 647
- John Edward Lloyd A history of Wales from the earliest times to the Edwardian conquest (Longmans, Green & Co.)

Regnal titles
Preceded by Rhys ab Owain ap Morgan Hen, Iestyn ab Owain ap Morgan Hen, and Hywel ab Owain ap Morgan Hen	King of Morgannwg; 1015–1033	Succeeded by Gruffudd ap Rhydderch
Preceded by Iestyn ab Owain ap Morgan Hen	Joint King of Glywysing (with Hywel ab Owain ap Morgan Hen); 1015–1033	Succeeded by Gruffudd ap Rhydderch
Preceded by Llywelyn ap Seisyll	King of Deheubarth; 1023–1033	Succeeded by Hywel ab Edwin
