= Caradog ap Gruffudd =

Welsh prince (died 1081)

Caradog ap Gruffudd (died 1081) was a Prince of Gwent in south-east Wales in the time of Gruffudd ap Llywelyn and the Norman conquest, who reunified his family's inheritance of Morgannwg and made repeated attempts to reunite southern Wales by claiming the inheritance of the kingdom of Deheubarth.

== Background and lineage ==
The family's stronghold was the kingdoms of Glywysing and the Gwent, and Caradog was the grandson of the King of Glywysing, Rhydderch ab Iestyn, who had been able to take over the throne of Deheubarth from 1023 until his death in 1033. Caradog's father Gruffudd ap Rhydderch, after receiving the lordship of Caerleon in 1031, also inherited Glywysing, and became King of Deheubarth in 1045, in the same year as Gruffudd's second cousin, Cadwgan ap Meurig, inherited the Kingdom of Gwent from his father Meurig ap Hywel. Both of them were co-descendants of Owain, son of Morgan Hen, the last ruler of a unified Kingdom of Morgannwg.

Gruffudd ap Rhydderch was said to be a powerful king who stoutly resisted raids by the Danes and attacks by Gruffudd ap Llywelyn. However, in 1055 Gruffudd ap Llywelyn killed him in battle and took Deheubarth, campaigning through upper Gwent with an army of Welsh, Saxons and Danes to defeat Ralph, Earl of Hereford.

== Early career ==
After Gruffudd ap Llywelyn's victory in battle near Glasbury in 1056, by 1057 Gruffudd was recognized as King of Wales and Caradog received Caerleon. From the family's stronghold in Gwent, Caradog appears to have been able to add his Morgannwg inheritance during his early career. After the defeat of Gruffudd ap Llylewyn by Harold Godwinson in 1063, old lineages in the south were restored, with Caradog becoming ruler of Glywysing at about the same time as Maredudd ab Owain ab Edwin, the male-line heir of Hywel Dda, became ruler of Deheubarth.

=== Contest over Gwent ===
Harold Godwinson subsequently began to build a hunting lodge in Portskewett. In 1065 Caradog attacked and destroyed Harold's hunting lodge, going on to ravage the district with his forces. Then, after Harold's defeat at the Battle of Hastings, the Normans sacked south-east Wales and parts of Gwent in response to Eadric's Herefordshire rebellion in alliance with the Welsh prince of Gwynedd (and Powys), Bleddyn ap Cynfyn. King Maredudd of Deheubarth decided not to resist the Norman encroachment on Gwent and was rewarded with lands in England in 1070, at the same time as the chronicler Orderic Vitalis noted in his Historia Ecclesiastica that a Welsh king named "Caducan" (Cadwgan ap Meurig) suffered defeat in battle at the hands of William FitzOsbern, 1st Earl of Hereford.

== Contest for Deheubarth ==
Caradog thereafter set out to emulate his father and grandfather by adding Deheubarth to his realm. In 1072 he defeated and killed King Maredudd of Deheubarth in a battle by the Rhymney River. In 1074 Caradog took over control over what was left of the war-ravaged kingdom of Gwent from Cadwgan ap Meurig.

In 1078 Caradog won another victory over Rhys ab Owain, who had succeeded Maredudd as prince of Deheubarth, killing him too. By 1081 he had forced the new prince of Deheubarth, Rhys ap Tewdwr, to flee to St David's Cathedral.

However, the situation was changed by the arrival from Ireland of Gruffudd ap Cynan, who was aiming to seize the throne of Gwynedd from Trahaearn ap Caradog. Rhys ap Tewdwr and Gruffudd ap Cynan met at St David's Cathedral and made an alliance with the blessing of the Bishop of St Davids.

=== Killed at the Battle of Mynydd Carn ===
Caradog countered this by himself making an alliance with the King of Gwynedd, Trahaearn ap Caradog. The two factions met in battle at Mynydd Carn, about a day's march north of St Davids. Caradog and his ally Trahaearn were both killed.

== Succession ==
Caradog left a son, Owain ap Caradog, who contented himself with the rule of Gwynllwg and was the founder of the line of the Lords of Caerleon, while Iestyn ap Gwrgant became King of Morgannwg.

Regnal titles
Preceded by Gruffudd ap Rhydderch	Lord of Gwynllwg-Caerleon; 1055/1057–1081	Succeeded by Owain ap Caradog
Preceded by Gruffudd ap Llywelyn (as part of the Kingdom of Morgannwg)	King of Glywysing (as part of the Kingdom of Morgannwg); 1063–1074	Succeeded by merged into the King of Morgannwg
Preceded by Cadwgan ap Meurig	King of Gwent (as part of the Kingdom of Morgannwg) c. 1074	Succeeded by merged into the King of Morgannwg
Preceded by Maredudd ab Owain ab Edwin	Pretender King of Deheubarth; 1072–1081	Succeeded by Rhys ap Tewdwr
Preceded by Cadwgan ap Meurig	King of Morgannwg; 1075–1081	Succeeded by Iestyn ap Gwrgant
