= Battle of Mynydd Carn =

Historic Welsh military engagement

| Date | 1081 |
| Location | north of St David's (However, see note below) |
| Result | Victory for Gruffudd and Rhys |

Belligerents
| Gruffudd ap Cynan; Rhys ap Tewdwr | Trahaearn ap Caradog †; Caradog ap Gruffydd † |

Casualties and losses
| Unknown, said to be light | Unknown, Trahaearn, Caradog and other notables killed |

The Battle of Mynydd Carn took place in 1081, as part of a dynastic struggle for control of the Welsh kingdoms of Gwynedd and Deheubarth. The result of the battle had a radical effect on the history of Wales.

The battle is recorded in the near-contemporary biography of one of the participants, The History of Gruffydd ap Cynan. Gruffudd ap Cynan was a descendant of the traditional ruling house of Gwynedd, and had previously made an attempt to claim the kingdom in 1075, but had been defeated by Trahaearn ap Caradog and forced to take refuge in Ireland.

In 1081, Gruffudd launched an invasion from Waterford in Ireland, having gathered a force of Danes and Irishmen to support his claim. He landed not in Gwynedd but further south near St David's (in what would become the Paladin of Pembrokeshire). At the church of St David's he met with Rhys ap Tewdwr, king of Deheubarth who had shortly before been driven from power by Caradog ap Gruffydd of Glamorgan and Gwent helped by Meilir ap Rhiwallon of Powys and Gruffudd's old nemesis Trahaearn ap Caradog of Gwynedd. Gruffudd and Rhys made a pact and set forth to give battle.

== The battle ==
The battle took place about a day's march north of St David's. In the evening Gruffudd and Rhys came up with the forces led by Trahaearn and Caradog ap Gruffydd, who are reported to have had Norman arbalisters in their army. According to his biography, Gruffudd ap Cynan insisted on an immediate attack, overruling Rhys who wished to wait until the following morning. The result was a complete victory for Gruffudd ap Cynan and Rhys ap Tewdwr, with Trahaearn ap Caradog, Caradog ap Gruffydd and Meilir ap Rhiwallon all being killed. (Note: Some sources, including the UK Ordnance Survey maps, place the battle a little southwest of the village of Templeton, about 35 km southeast of St Davids. What seems clear is that the actual location is unknown with any certaintly.)

== Aftermath ==
Gruffudd ap Cynan gained control of Gwynedd, and despite later being captured and imprisoned by the Normans for some years, escaped and reigned until 1137 becoming one of the most successful leaders of Gwynedd. Rhys ap Tewdwr regained Deheubarth and reigned until 1093. These two were later to play a prominent part in Welsh resistance to the Normans. The immediate aftermath of the battle helped the Normans who took advantage quickly of this internal Welsh struggle which weakened all the major Welsh kingdoms and killed three of their leaders. Later that year William the Conqueror became the first Norman King to enter Wales and signalled his power by marching straight through modern day South Wales along to St David's. There he received homage from Rhys ap Tewdwr who accepted William's overlordship. The death of Caradog ap Gruffydd split his kingdom leaving it in disarray and helped ensure Norman dominance of the lowlands of Gwent and Glamorgan leading to the effective collapse of what had formerly been one of the most powerful Welsh kingdoms.

== Bibliography ==
- The Welsh Academy Encyclopaedia of Wales, University of Wales Press, 2008, ISBN 978-0-7083-1953-6
- A history of Wales from the earliest times, Volume 2, 1911, John Edward Lloyd
