= Rhys ap Tewdwr =

King of Deheubarth (died 1093)

Rhys ap Tedwr

Prince of Deheubarth
- Reign: 1078–1093
- Predecessor: Rhys ab Owain
- Successor: Gruffydd ap Rhys
- Born: 1040; Carmarthenshire, Wales
- Died: April 1093 (aged 52–53); Brecon, Powys, Wales
- Spouse: Catrin (or Gwladus) verch Lestyn; Gwladys ferch Rhiwallon
- Issue: Goronwy; Hywel; Owain; Gruffydd; Gwellian; Nest ferch Rhys; Efa; Ardden
- House: Dinefwr
- Father: Tewdwr ap Cadell
- Mother: Gwenllian ferch Gwyn of Dyfed

Rhys ap Tewdwr (c. 1040 – 1093) was a king of Deheubarth in Wales and member of the Dinefwr dynasty, a branch descended from Rhodri the Great. Following the Norman Conquest, he had to pay William the Conqueror to keep his kingdom, which lasted until the end of William's reign.

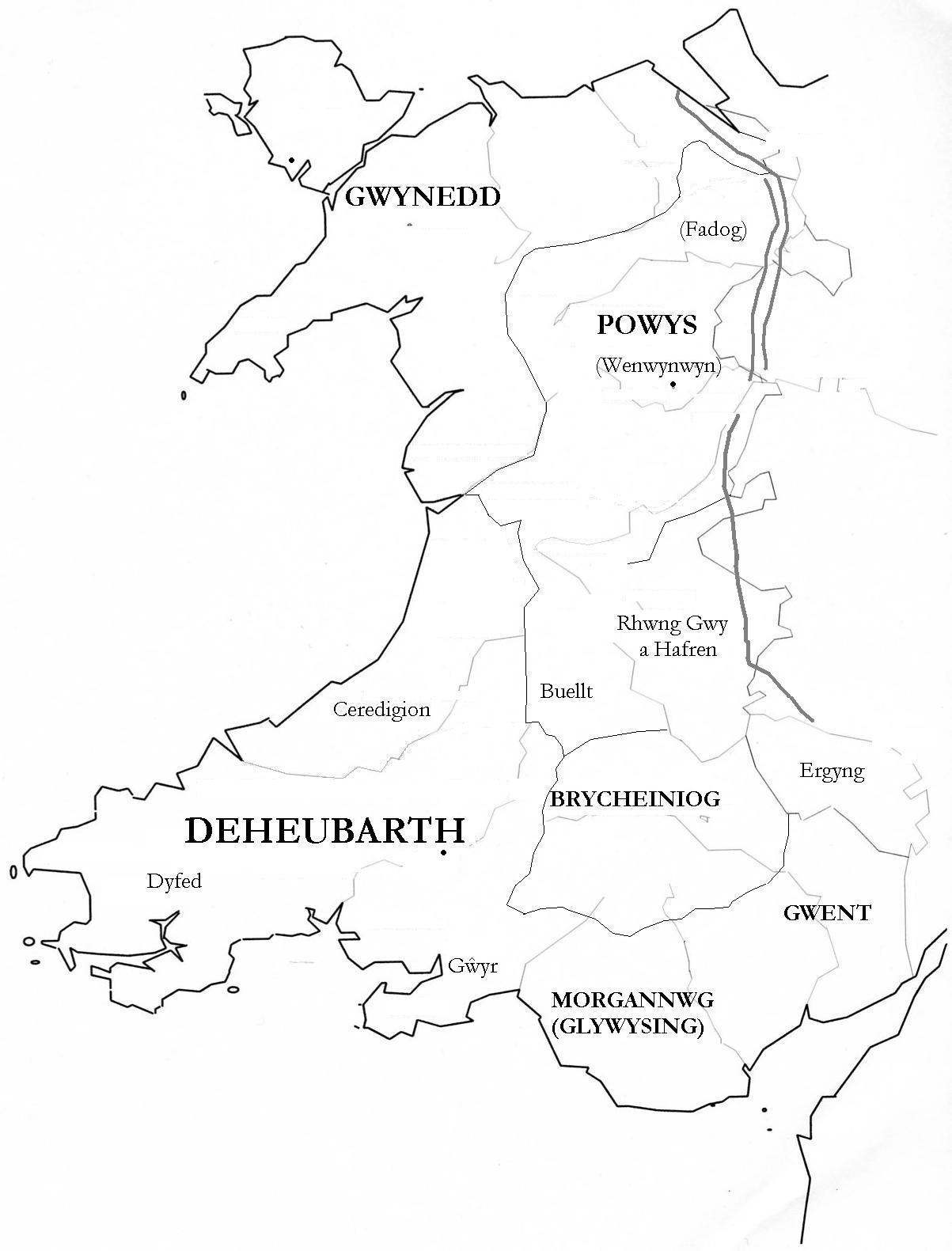
Medieval Wales, showing Deheubarth in the southwest

== Family ==
Rhys ap Tewdwr was born in the area which is now Carmarthenshire. As a member of the House of Dinefwr, he claimed the throne of Deheubarth following the death of his second cousin Rhys ab Owain, who was beheaded after the battle of Gwdig (modern day Goodwick) against Caradog ap Gruffydd in 1078.

He was a grandson of Cadell ab Einion ab Owain ab Hywel Dda and a great-grandson of Einion ab Owain, thus a descendant of Hywel Dda, king of the Britons.

He married more than once. His first wife was Catrin (or Gwladus) verch Iestyn (b. 1041 in Powys). The name of his last wife was Gwladys ferch Rhiwallon, daughter of Rhiwallon ap Cynfyn of the Mathrafal Dynasty of Powys.

Issue by early alliances:

- Goronwy (died 1103)
- Hywel
- Owain

Issue by Gwladys ferch Rhiwallon:

- Gruffydd
- Gwellian
- Nest who married Gerald de Windsor, Constable of Pembroke, progenitors of the FitzGerald and de Barry dynasties of Ireland. These Hiberno-Norman, or Cambro-Norman, families have been Peers of Ireland since at least the 14th century.
- Efa
- Ardden.

== Rule ==
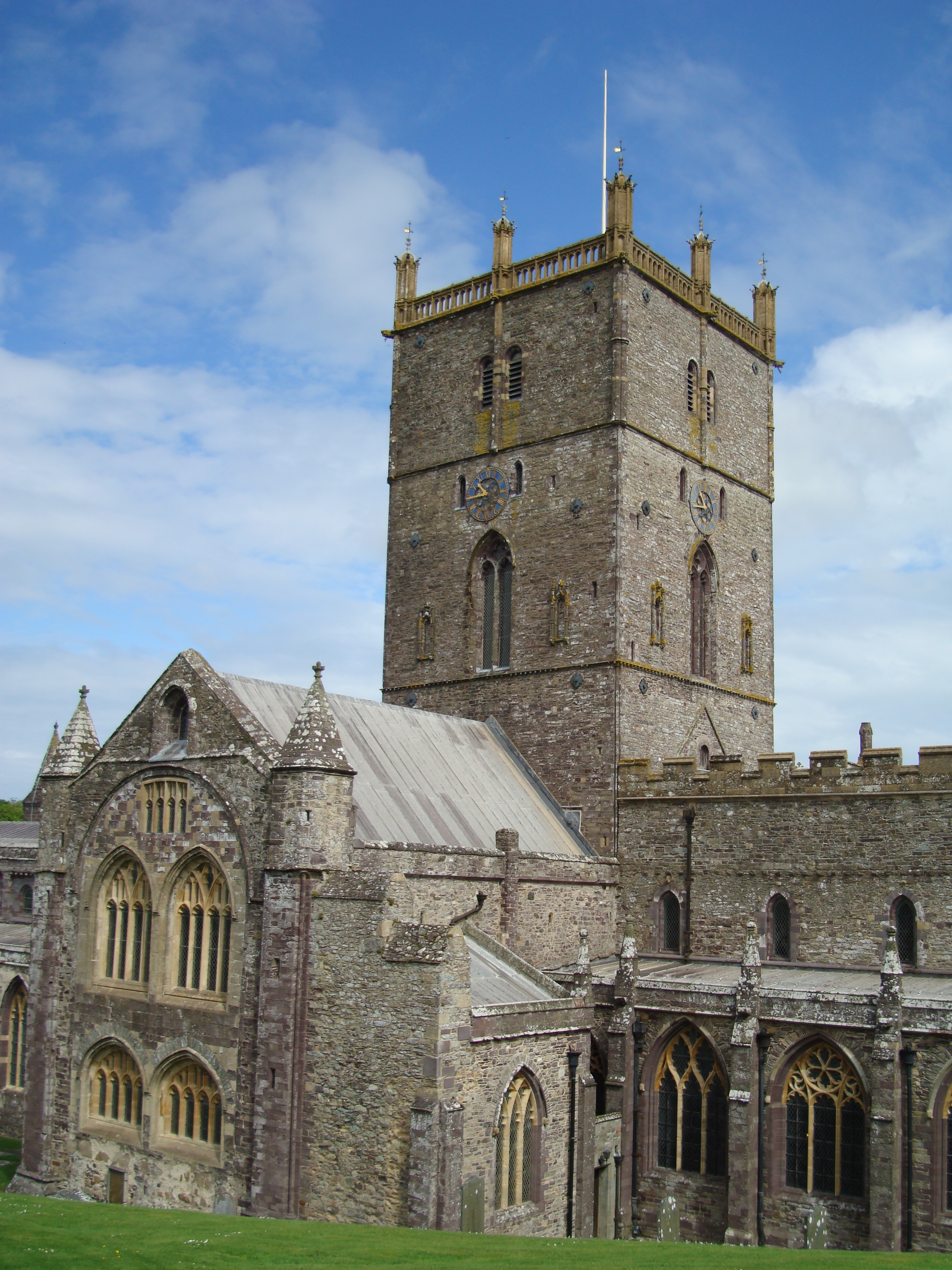
St. David's Cathedral today

In 1081 Caradog ap Gruffydd invaded Deheubarth and drove Rhys to seek sanctuary in the Monastery of St David.

Rhys, however, made an alliance with Gruffudd ap Cynan who was seeking to regain the throne of the Kingdom of Gwynedd, and at the Battle of Mynydd Carn in the same year they defeated and killed Caradog ap Gruffydd and his allies Trahaearn ap Caradog of Gwynedd and Meilyr ap Rhiwallon.

The same year William the Conqueror visited Deheubarth, ostensibly on a pilgrimage to St David's, but with a major show of power as well, traversing the width of southern Wales, and it seems likely he came to an arrangement with Rhys, whereby Rhys paid him homage and was confirmed in possession of Deheubarth. Rhys paid William £40 a year for his kingdom, ensuring good future relations with William that lasted until the end of William's lifetime. Rhys was content with the arrangement as it meant that he had to deal only with the jealousy of his fellow Welsh princes.

In 1088 Cadwgan ap Bleddyn of Powys attacked Deheubarth and forced Rhys to flee to Ireland. However, Rhys returned later the same year with a fleet from Ireland and defeated the men of Powys, in a battle in which two of Cadwgan's brothers, Madog and Rhiryd, were killed.

The Chronicle of the Princes claims that Cedifor ap Gollwyn, a man who traced his ancestry to the original kings of Dyfed (since the start of the previous century, the usual rulers of Deheubarth had descended from an invader, Cadell ap Rhodri)), commanded substantial authority in Dyfed. When Cedifor died in 1091, his sons demanded that Rhys surrender the throne to Gruffudd ap Maredudd, the son of a former king of Deheubarth (and the nephew of Rhys' predecessor). This triggered a revolt, but Rhys was able to defeat the rebels in a battle at St. Dogmaels, killing Gruffudd.

== Death and succession ==
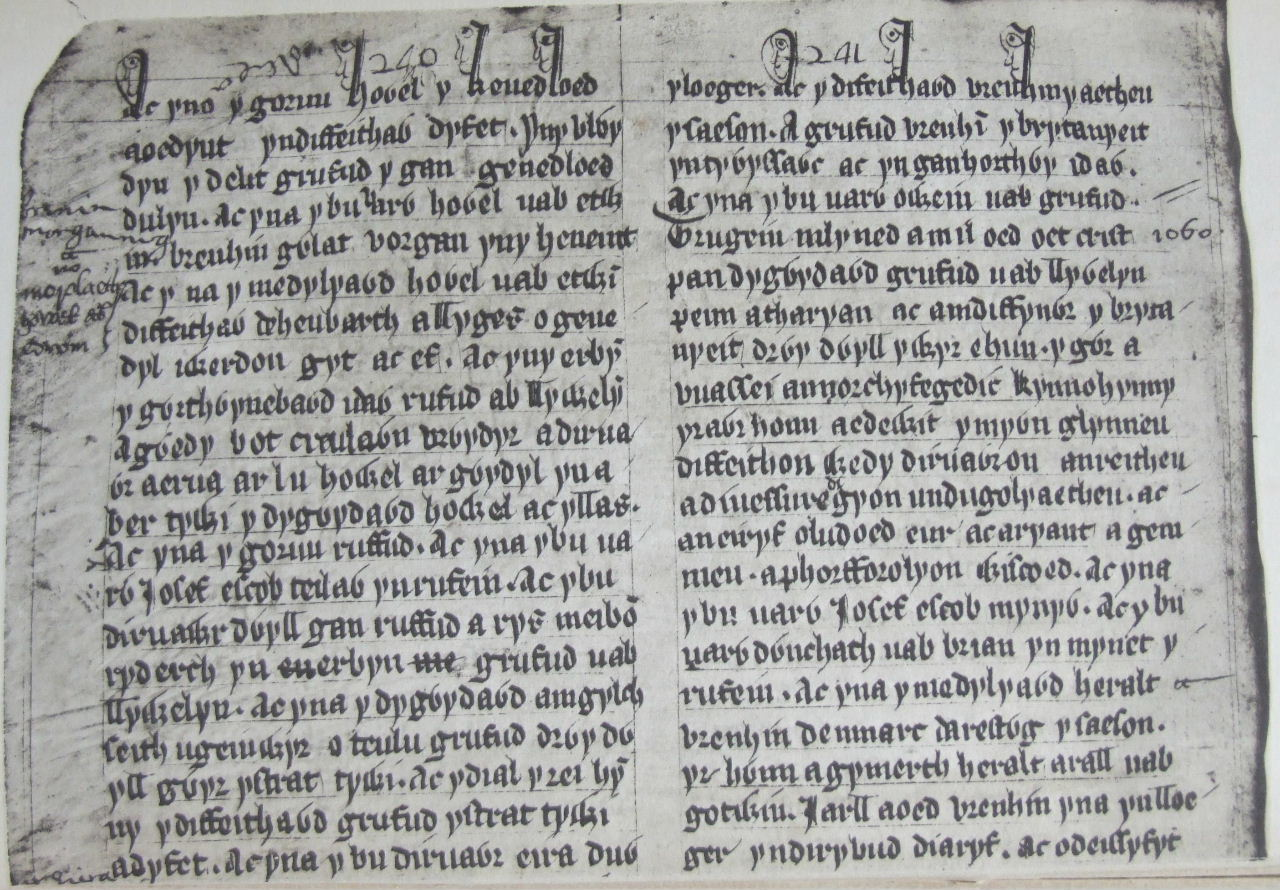
Part of the Welsh version of Brut y Tywysogion found in the Red Book of Hergest

Rhys was unable to withstand the increasing Norman pressure. The Welsh Bruts (chronicles) state that "Rhys ap Tewdwr, king of Deheubarth, was slain by the Frenchmen who were inhabiting Brycheiniog." The Brut y Tywysogion adds "and with him fell the kingdom of the Britons." This passage lends evidence to the belief that the conquest of Brycheiniog (Brecon), led by Bernard de Neufmarche, was mostly finished by Eastertide 1093. The battle of Brecon opened the way to the conquest of Deheubarth.

The monastery and village of Penrhys in Rhondda Cynon Taff is said to be named for Rhys, as he was beheaded at the site by Norman forces. The village was originally named, Pen-Rhys ap Tewdwr (English: Rhys ap Tewdwr's Head). Upon Rhys's death, the Normans seized much of south Wales, and there was fighting over the spoils with the chieftains of Powys and Gwynedd. Eventually, Rhys's eldest son, Gruffydd, was allowed to inherit a small portion of his father's kingdom. Rhys's daughter Nest was briefly one of the numerous concubines of Henry I, to whom she bore a son, and thereafter the wife of Gerald FitzWalter of Pembroke; their sons and grandsons, the FitzGerald conquerors of Ireland, were known collectively as the "sons of Nest". Through his son Gruffydd, Rhys was an ancestor of the Tudor dynasty.

== See also ==
- Kings of Wales family trees

== Footnotes ==
Preceded by Rhys ab Owain	Prince of Deheubarth; 1078–1093	Succeeded by Gruffydd ap Rhys
