= Deheubarth =

Term for the medieval realms of southern Wales

Coordinates: 51.8768°N 4.0184°W

Kingdom of Deheubarth Teyrnas Deheubarth (Welsh)
- 920–1197
- Anthem: Unbennaeth Prydain "The Monarchy of Britain"
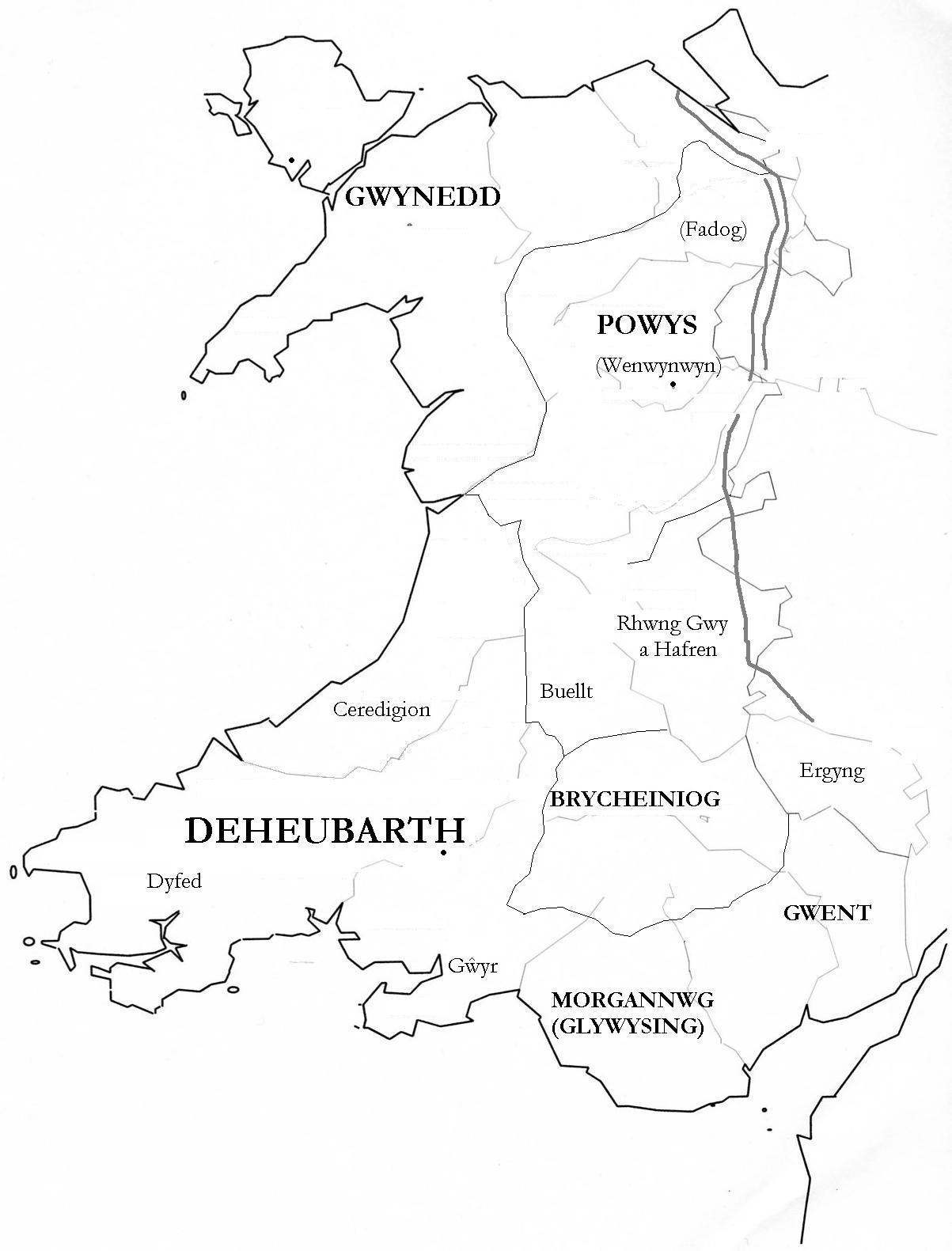
- Medieval kingdoms of Wales
- Capital: Dinefwr
- Common languages: Old Welsh
- Government: Monarchy
  - 920–950: Hywel Dda
  - 1081: Rhys ap Tewdwr
  - 1155–1197: Rhys ap Gruffydd
- Historical era: Middle Ages
  - Established: 920
  - Disestablished: 1197
- Currency: ceiniog cyfreith & ceiniog cwta
Preceded by	Succeeded by
Seisyllwg; Kingdom of Dyfed	Principality of Wales
- Today part of: United Kingdom: ∟Wales

Deheubarth (Welsh pronunciation: [dɛˈhəɨbarθ]; lit. 'Right-hand Part', thus 'the South') was a regional name for the realms of south Wales, particularly as opposed to Gwynedd (Latin: Venedotia). It is now used as a shorthand for the various realms united under the House of Dinefwr, but that Deheubarth itself was not considered a proper kingdom on the model of Gwynedd, Powys, or Dyfed is shown by its rendering in Latin as dextralis pars or as Britonnes dexterales ("the Southern Britons") and not as a named land. In the oldest British writers, Deheubarth was used for all of modern Wales to distinguish it from Hen Ogledd (Y Gogledd), the northern lands whence Cunedda originated.

== History ==
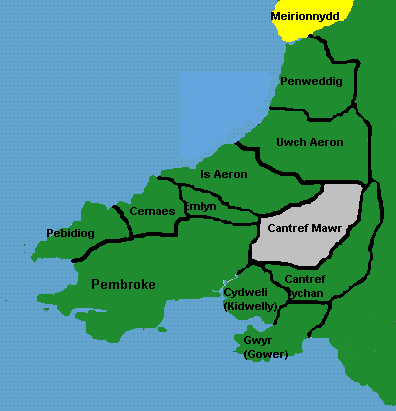
Cantrefi of Deheubarth, c. 1160.

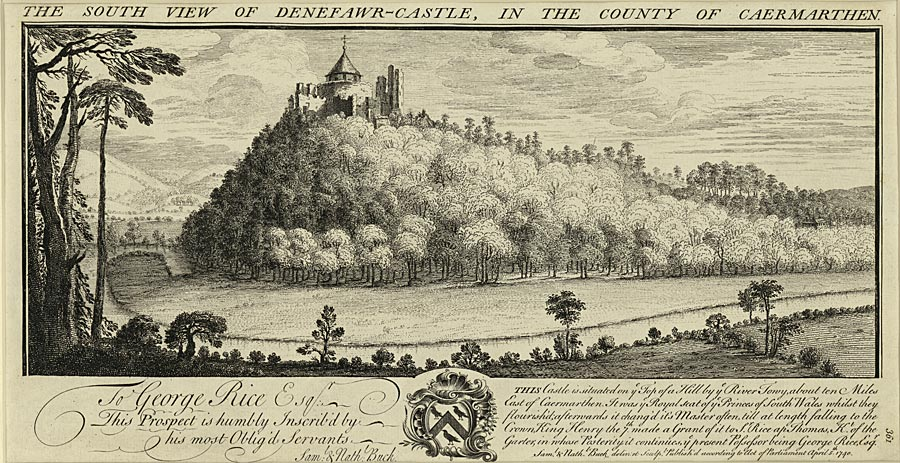
Dinefwr Castle, 1740

Deheubarth was united around 920 by Hywel Dda out of the territories of Seisyllwg and Dyfed, which had come into his possession. Later on, the Kingdom of Brycheiniog was also added. Hywel's dynasty fortified and built up a base at Dinefwr, near Llandeilo, giving them their name.

After the high-water mark set by Hywel, Dinefwr was repeatedly overrun. First, by the Welsh of the north and east: by Llywelyn ap Seisyll of Gwynedd in 1018; by Rhydderch ab Iestyn of Morgannwg in 1023; by Gruffydd ap Llywelyn of Gwynedd in 1041 and 1043. In 1075, Rhys ab Owain and the noblemen of Ystrad Tywi succeeded in killing their lord Bleddyn ap Cynfyn. Although Rhys was quickly overrun by Gwynedd and Gwent, his cousin Rhys ap Tewdwr – through his marriage into Bleddyn's family and through battle – reestablished his dynasty's hegemony over south Wales just in time for the second wave of conquest: a prolonged Norman invasion under the Marcher Lords. In 1093, Rhys was killed in unknown circumstances while resisting their expansion into Brycheiniog and his son Gruffydd was briefly thrown into exile.

Following the death of Henry I, in 1136 Gruffydd formed an alliance with Gwynedd for the purpose of a revolt against Norman incursions. He took part in Owain Gwynedd and Cadwaladr ap Gruffydd's victory over the Normans at Crug Mawr. The newly liberated region of Ceredigion, though, was not returned to his family but annexed by Owain.

The long and capable rule of Gruffydd's son the Lord Rhys – and the civil wars that followed Owain's death in Gwynedd – briefly permitted the South to reassert the hegemony Hywel Dda had enjoyed two centuries before. On his death in 1197, though, Rhys redivided his kingdom among his several sons and none of them ever again rivalled his power. By the time Llywelyn the Great won the wars in Gwynedd, in the first half of the 13th century, lords in Deheubarth merely appear among his clients.

Following the conquest of Wales by Edward I, the lords in Deheubarth became vassals of the Kingdom of England under the Treaty of Aberconwy, but after joining Dafydd ap Gruffudd's unsuccessful rebellion in 1282 they lost control of Deheubarth and the South was divided into the historic counties of Cardiganshire, Carmarthenshire and Pembrokeshire by the Statute of Rhuddlan.

== Religion ==
In the arena of the church, Sulien was the leader of the monastic community at Llanbadarn Fawr in Ceredigion. Born ca. 1030, he became Bishop of St David's in 1073 and again in 1079/80. Both of his sons followed him into the service of the church. At this time the prohibition against the marriage of clerics was not yet established. His sons produced a number of manuscripts and original Latin and vernacular poems. They were very active in the ecclesiastical and political life of Deheubarth. One son, Rhygyfarch (Latin: Ricemarchus) of Llanbadarn Fawr, wrote the Life of Saint David and another, Ieuan, was a skilful scribe and illuminator. He copied some of the works of Augustine of Hippo and may have written the Life of St. Padarn.

== List of rulers ==
The kingdom of Deheubarth was formed by the union of the kingdoms of Ceredigion, Seisyllwg and Dyfed. Ceredigion was absorbed into Seisyllwg and Dyfed was merged with Seisyllwg to form Deheubarth in 909.

=== Ceredigion ===
- Ceredig ap Cunedda (424–453)
- Usai (453–490)
- Serwyl (490–525)
- Boddw (525–560)
- Arthfoddw (560–595)
- Arthlwys (595–630)
- Clydog I (630–665)

=== Dyfed ===
- Ednyfed - realm also included the Caer-Went part of Gwent (his brother received the remainder)
- Clotri
- Triffyn Farfog
- Aergol Lawhir (?-c. 515)
- Vortiporius (c. 540)
- Arthur ap Pedr
- Cloten (c. 630) married Ceindrech of Brycheiniog, uniting the two kingdoms of Dyfed and Brycheiniog
- Rhain ap Cadwgan (c. 690-740) - also king of Brycheiniog. On his death, his kingdoms were divided again by his sons.
- Tewdwr ap Rhain
- Maredudd ap Tewdws (c. 740–797)
- Rhain ap Maredudd (c. 797–808)
- Owain ap Maredudd (c. 808–810)
- Triffyn ap Rhain (?-c. 814)
- Hyfaidd
- Llywarch ap Hyfaidd (c. 893-904)
- Rhodri ap Hyfaidd (c. 904-905)
- Hywel Dda ("Hywel the Good") (c. 905-909), an invader from Seisllywg who conquered Dyfed (but later chronicles claim he acquired it by marrying Llywarch's daughter)

=== Seisyllwg ===
- Seisyll ap Clydog, prince of Ceredigion (eponym and possibly founder of Seisyllwg)
- Arthen (?-807)
- Dyfnwallon
- Meurig of Seisyllwg
- Gwgon of Seisyllwg (?-c. 870/871)

House Manaw

- Angharad ferch Meurig (?-872) and Rhodri the Great (?–873/877/878) - stewards
- Cadell ap Rhodri, second son of Anghared and Rhodri (872–909)
- Hywel Dda (Hywel the Good) (909-920) - he ruled Seisyllwg in 920 and shortly thereafter merged it with Dyfed into Deheubarth

=== Deheubarth ===
- Hywel Dda (Hywel the Good) (920–950)
- His son, Owain ap Hywel (950–986)
  - Rhodri ap Hywel (950–953) and
  - Edwin ap Hywel (950–954)
- Owain ap Hywel's son, Maredudd ab Owain (986–999)
- Cynan ap Hywel, prince of Gwynedd (999–1005)
- the sons of Einion ab Owain (brother of Maredudd ab Owain), who ruled jointly:
  - Edwin ab Einion (1005–1018)
  - Cadell ab Einion (1005–1018)
- Llywelyn ap Seisyll, prince of Gwynedd (1018–1023)
- Rhydderch ap Iestyn, prince of Glywysing (1023–1033)
- Edwin ab Einion's son, Hywel ab Edwin (1033–1044)
- Rhydderch ap Iestyn's son, Gruffydd ap Rhydderch (1047–1055)
- Gruffydd ap Llywelyn, invader and prince of Gwynedd (1055–1063)
- Edwin ab Einion's grandson, Maredudd ab Owain ab Edwin (1063–1072)
- his brother, Rhys ab Owain (1072–1078)
- his second cousin, Rhys ap Tewdwr (1078–1093)

Deheubarth was in the possession of the Normans from 1093 to 1155

- Gruffydd ap Rhys (1116–1137) ruled a portion of Deheubarth with Norman permission
- his son, Anarawd ap Gruffydd (1136–1143)
- his brother, Cadell ap Gruffydd (1143–1151)
- his brother, Maredudd ap Gruffydd (1151–1155)
- his brother, The Lord Rhys (Rhys ap Gruffydd) (1155–1197)
- his son, Gruffydd ap Rhys (1197–1201) who for a time ruled jointly with his brother,
- Maelgwn ap Rhys (1199–1230) who disputed the territory with his brother,
- Rhys the Hoarse (Rhys Gryg) (1216–1234)

From 1234 to 1283, Deheubarth was subject to the princes of Gwynedd

- Rhys the Hoarse's son, Rhys Mechyll (1234–1244) ruled a portion of Deheubarth
- his brother, Maredudd ap Rhys (1244–1271) ruled a portion of Deheubarth
- his son, Rhys ap Maredudd (1271–1283) ruled a portion of Deheubarth

== See also ==
- Goronwy Foel
- House of Dinefwr
- List of rulers in Wales
