= Aberystwyth Castle =

Castle in Ceredigion, Wales

- Castell Aberystwyth (Welsh)
- Aberystwyth, Ceredigion, Wales
- Aerial view in 2024

Site information
- Type: Diamond-shaped concentric castle
- Controlled by: Aberystwyth Town Council
- Condition: Ruin

Location
- Location in Wales
- Location within Wales
- Coordinates: 52.41324°N 4.08968°W

Site history
- Built: 1277–1289
- Built by: Later work attributed to James of Saint George
- In use: Open to public
- Materials: Siltstone
- Demolished: 1649
- Events: Welsh Wars; English Civil War

Listed Building – Grade I

Aberystwyth Castle (Welsh: Castell Aberystwyth) is a Grade I listed Edwardian fortress located in Aberystwyth, Ceredigion, Mid Wales. It was built in response to the First Welsh War in the late 13th century, replacing an earlier fortress located a mile to the south. During a national uprising by Owain Glyndŵr, the Welsh captured the castle in 1404, but it was recaptured by the English four years later. From 1637, it housed a Royal mint of Charles I, which minted coins from locally mined silver. The castle was slighted by Oliver Cromwell in 1649.

== History ==
Marcher lord Gilbert Fitz Richard built an earlier motte and bailey castle a mile south of the current site in c. 1110. In 1116, it was unsuccessfully besieged by Gruffydd ap Rhys, Prince of Deheubarth. He was eventually successful in 1136, capturing it and burning it to the ground with the help of Owain Gwynedd and his brother, Cadwaladr ap Gruffydd, the sons of Gruffudd ap Cynan, King of Gwynedd. Their sister, Gwenllian ferch Gruffydd, Gruffydd ap Rhys's wife, had been killed in battle by Gruffudd ab Llywelyn, who commanded for the Norman, Maurice de Londres. She had taken a force to meet him in battle at Kidwelly. Owain Gwynedd gave the castle to Cadwaladr to rebuild, but in 1143, Cadwaladr was implicated in the murder of Anarawd ap Gruffydd, the new king of Deheubarth. Owain Gwynedd sent his son, Hywel ab Owain Gwynedd, to strip Cadwaladr of his lands in Ceredigion, and the castle was burned. It was rebuilt and later reinforced with timber and stone revetment and stone footings. After a succession of at least three owners, it was taken by Welsh prince Llywelyn the Great in 1221.

The current castle, as well as a new town, was built in a new location to the north, the current site, by Edward I of England. Construction began in 1277 after the end of the first war against Llywelyn ap Gruffudd, Llywelyn the Great's grandson. Work on the castle was initially slow, and at the start of the 1282 war, the Welsh took and burned both the castle and the town. Probably under master mason James of St George, the castle was eventually completed in 1289 for £4,000. It was besieged extensively during the revolt of Madog ap Llywelyn in 1294–5 but held out because it could be supplied by sea from Ireland.

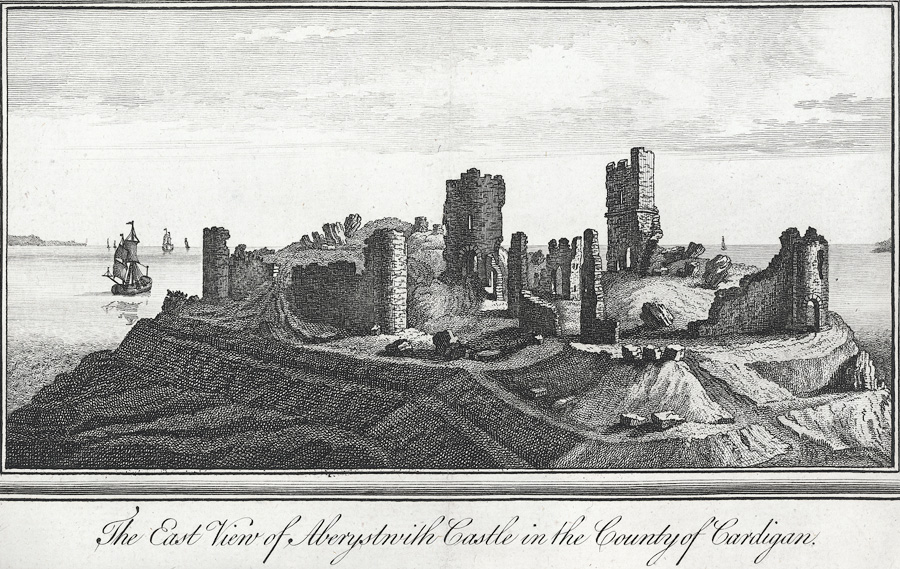
The ruins of Aberystwyth Castle, from the east view, in the county of Cardigan (1769)

The adjoining walled town took its name from the older and important nearby village of Llanbadarn Fawr, and was thus called Llanbadarn Gaerog (English: Fortified Llanbadarn). However, by the time of the Black Prince in 1343, the castle was in a bad state of disrepair; the main gateway and drawbridges, the king's hall and long chamber, the kitchen range, and the outer bailey were falling.

In 1404, Owain Glyndŵr captured and took possession of the castle during a national uprising against English occupation. It became a seat of government (Note: "The exact number of parliamentary and senedd meetings held by Glyndŵr is unknown, but there were events at Machynlleth, Harlech, Dolgellau, Llanbadarn (Aberystwyth) and at Cefn Caer (Pennal).") and in 1405, a treaty was signed between Glyndŵr and the King of France at the castle. Four years later, it was retaken by the English. In 1637 Thomas Bushell prevailed upon Charles I to establish a Royal mint in Aberystwyth, sited in the castle hall. This was authorised to mint the half-crown, shilling, half-shilling, two-pence, penny, groat, threepence, and half-penny coins, from silver that was mined locally in Ceredigion.

The mint's operator raised a regiment of Royalist soldiers during the English Civil War, and the mint ceased operations in September 1642, when Charles I issued the Wellington Declaration. Bushell seems to have removed bullion and equipment to Shrewsbury, and operations were diverted to Oxford. Oliver Cromwell's forces took the castle in 1646 and the castle was slighted in 1649.

Map showing the castle and headland at the south-western corner of Aberystwyth Seafront.

== Architecture ==
Building work started in 1277 at the time of the First Welsh War, during Edward I's first Welsh campaign, at the same time as work started at Flint, Rhuddlan and Builth Wells. The inner ward was built in a diamond-shaped concentric castle, with a twin D-shaped gatehouse keep and mural towers at each corner. The inner ward is enclosed by a narrow outer ward, and there was an enclosure to the north that has been lost to coastal erosion. The original building had no inner curtain wall to the west, prior to the war of 1282–83, after which it was added.

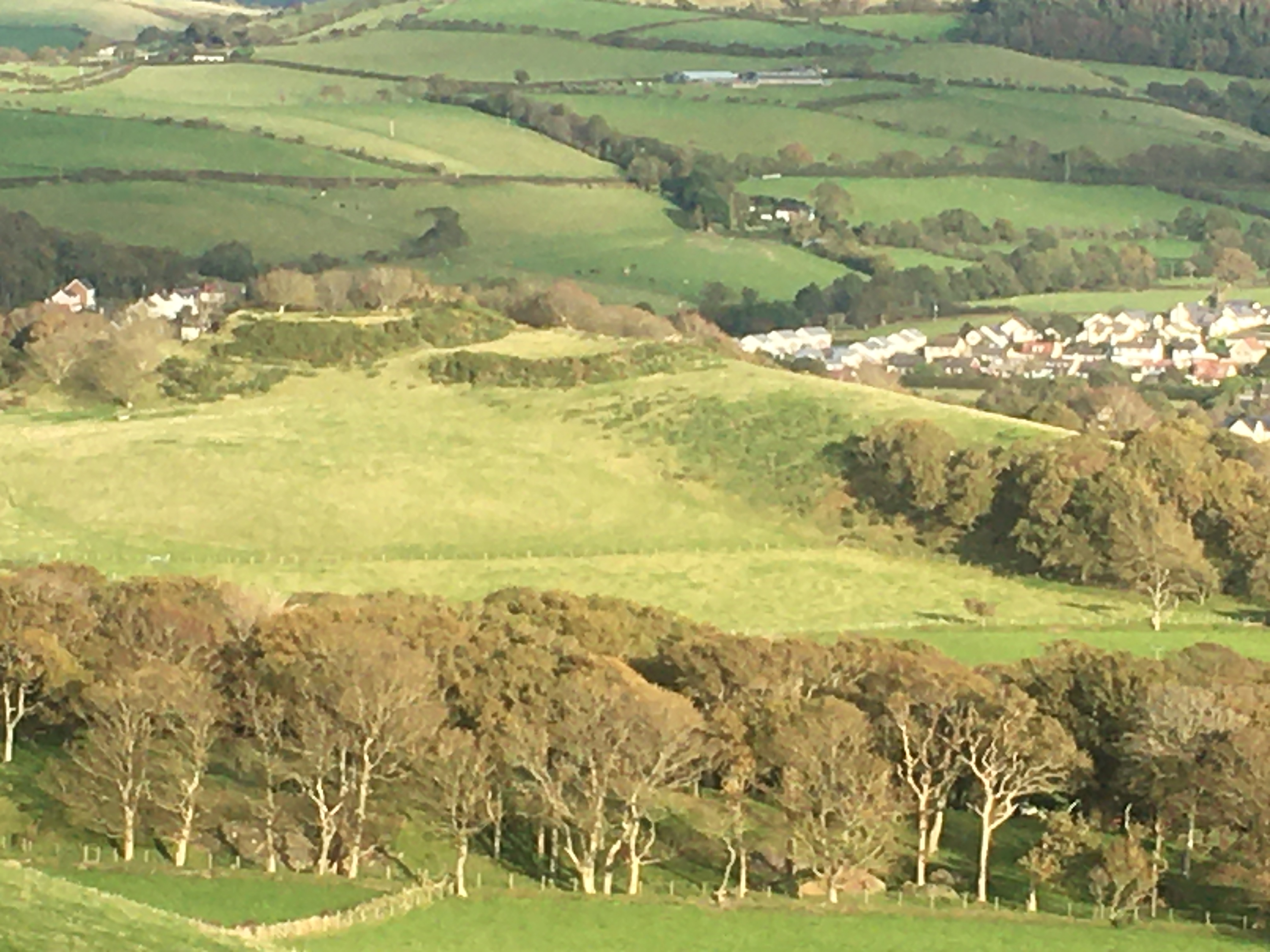
Site of original Aberystwyth Castle at Tan-y-Castell

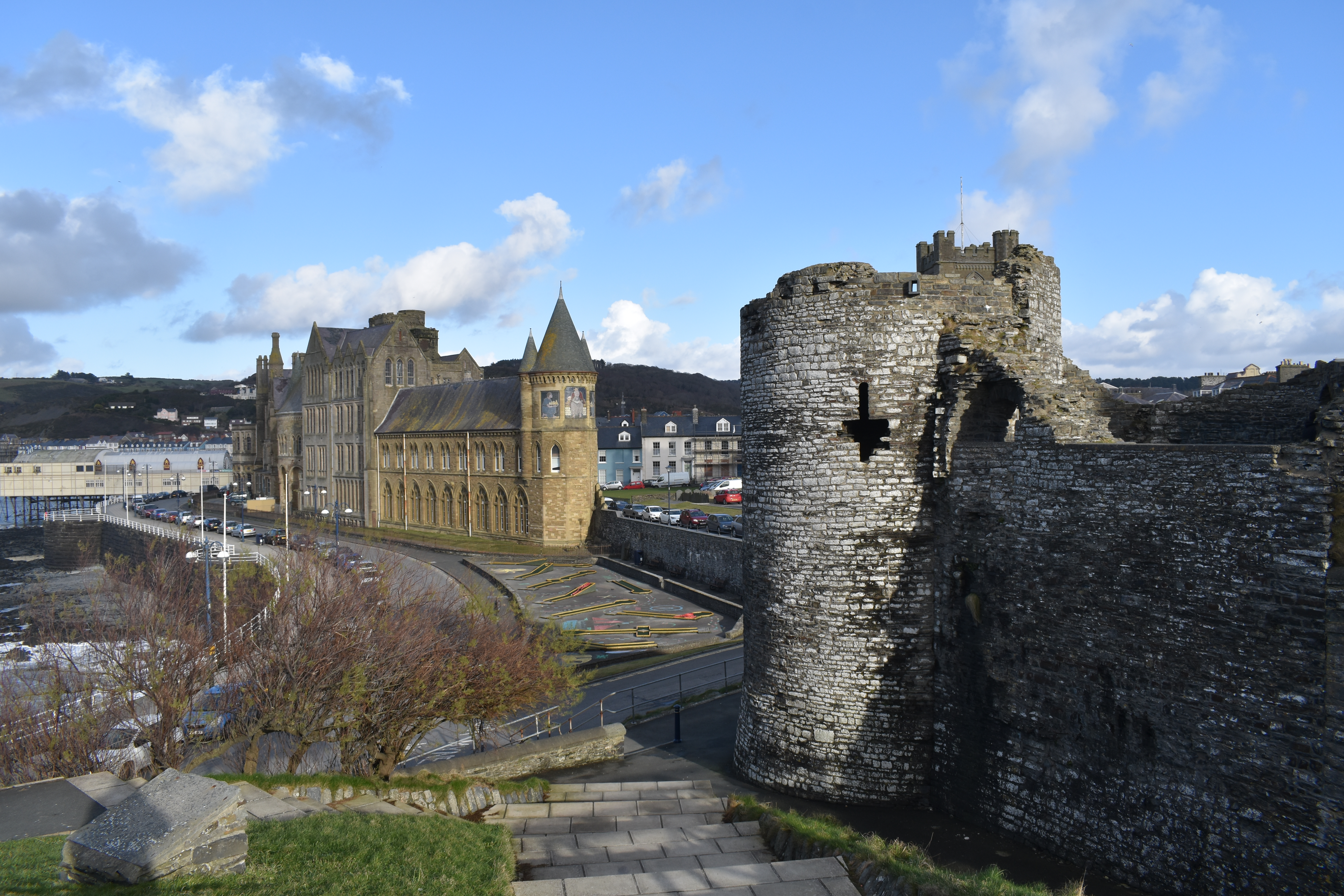
Castle walls, view over the Old College.

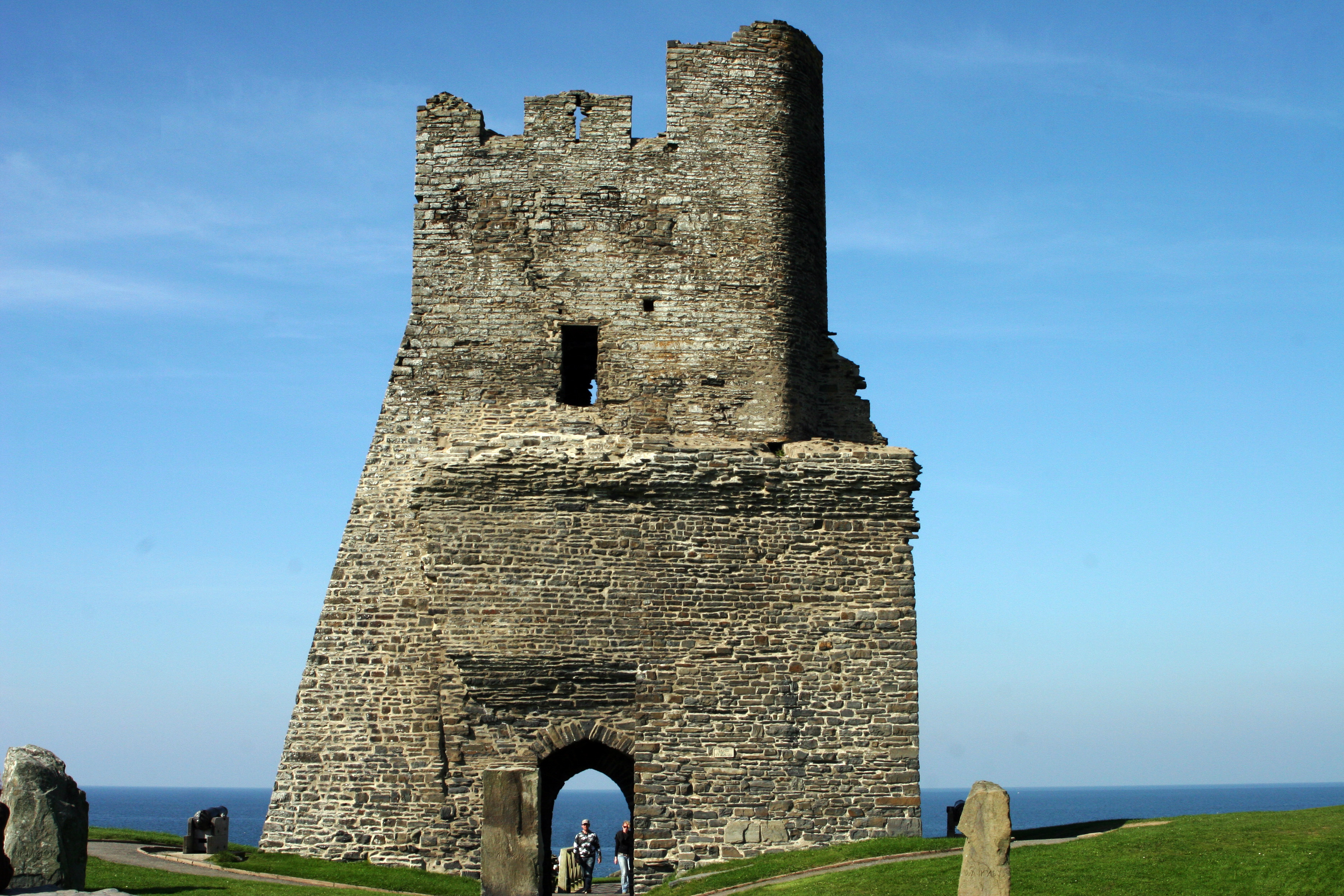
External view of the North Gate.

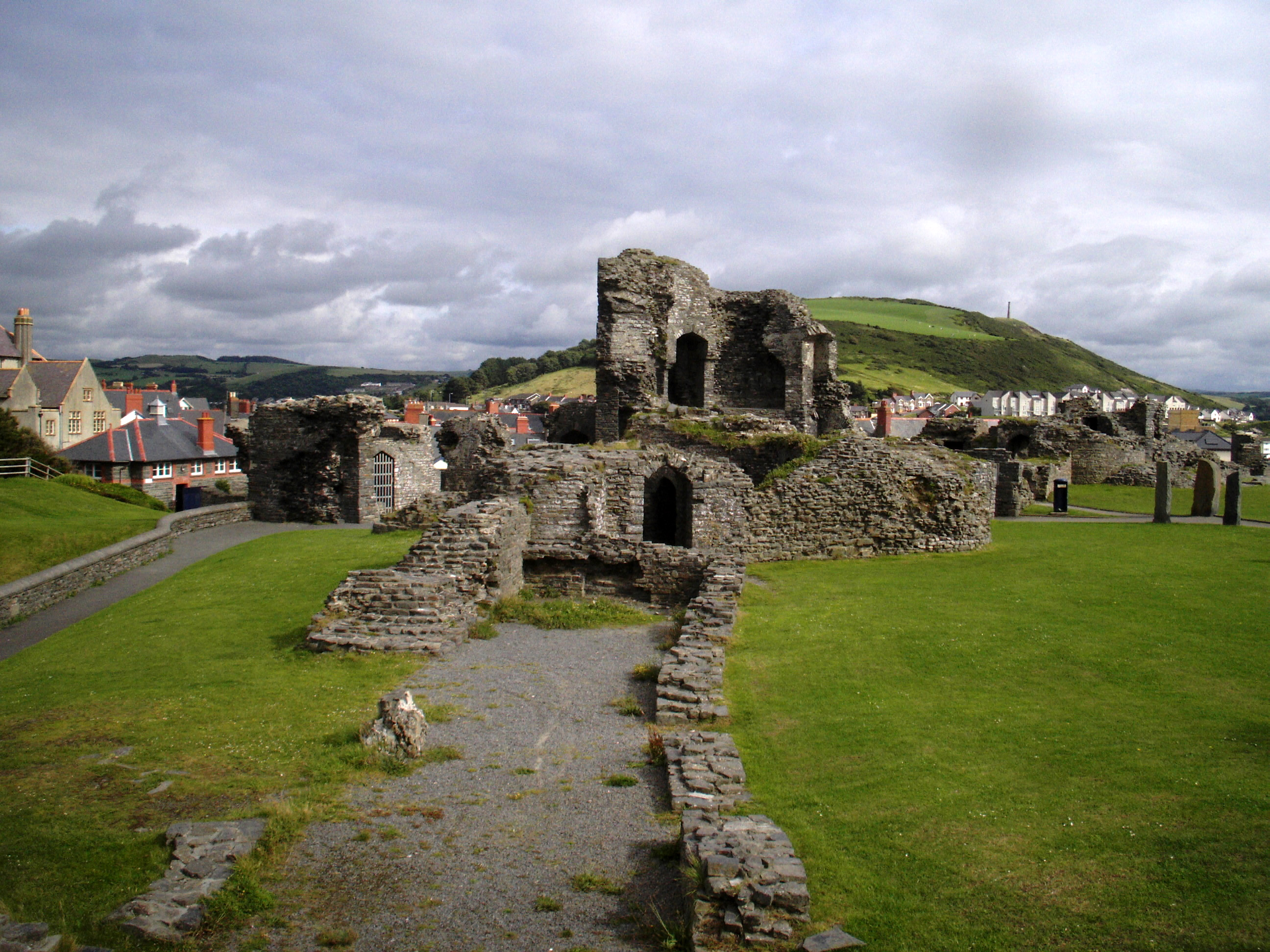
The remains of the D-shaped towers that formed the inner ward's gatehouse keep.

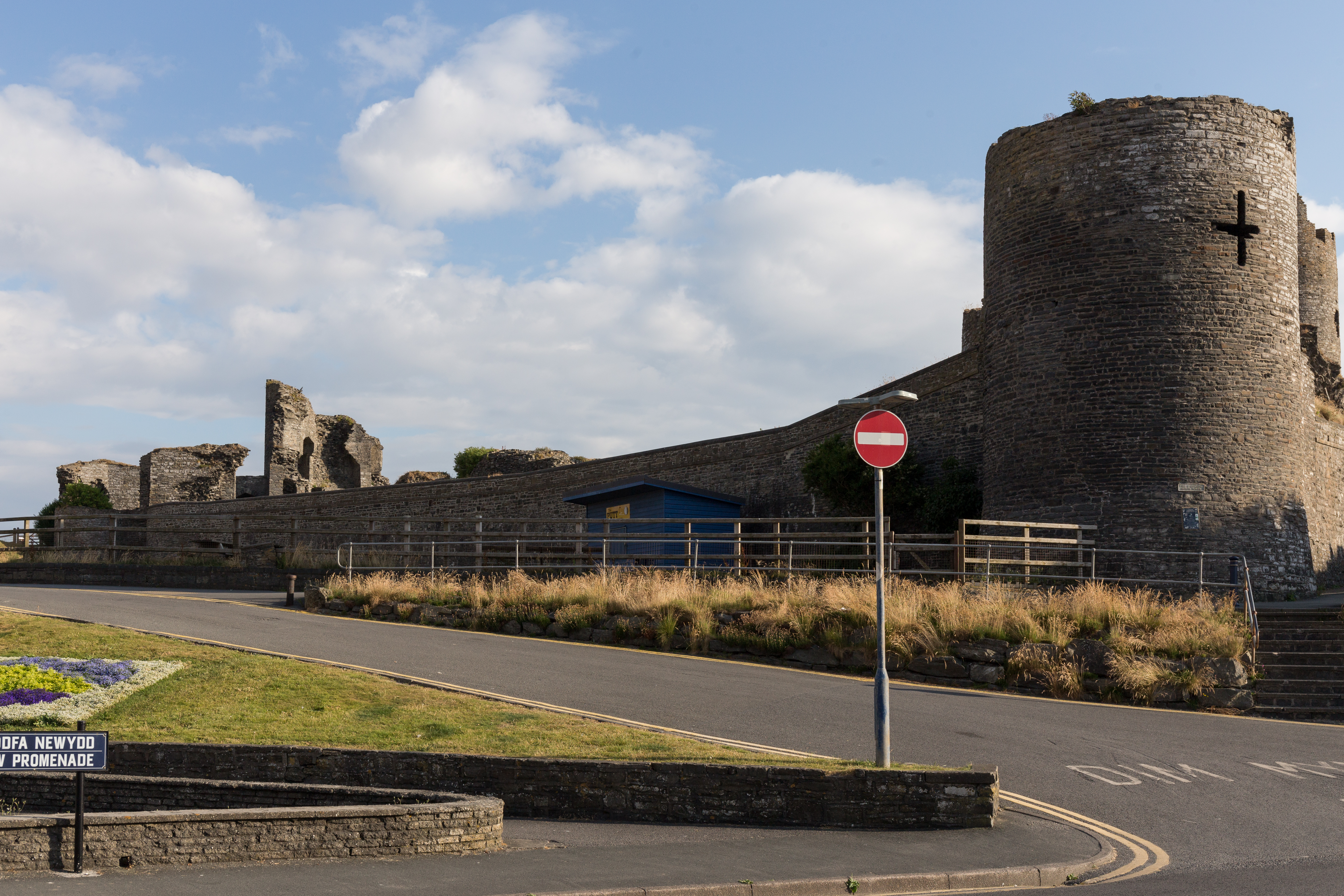
Side walls view.

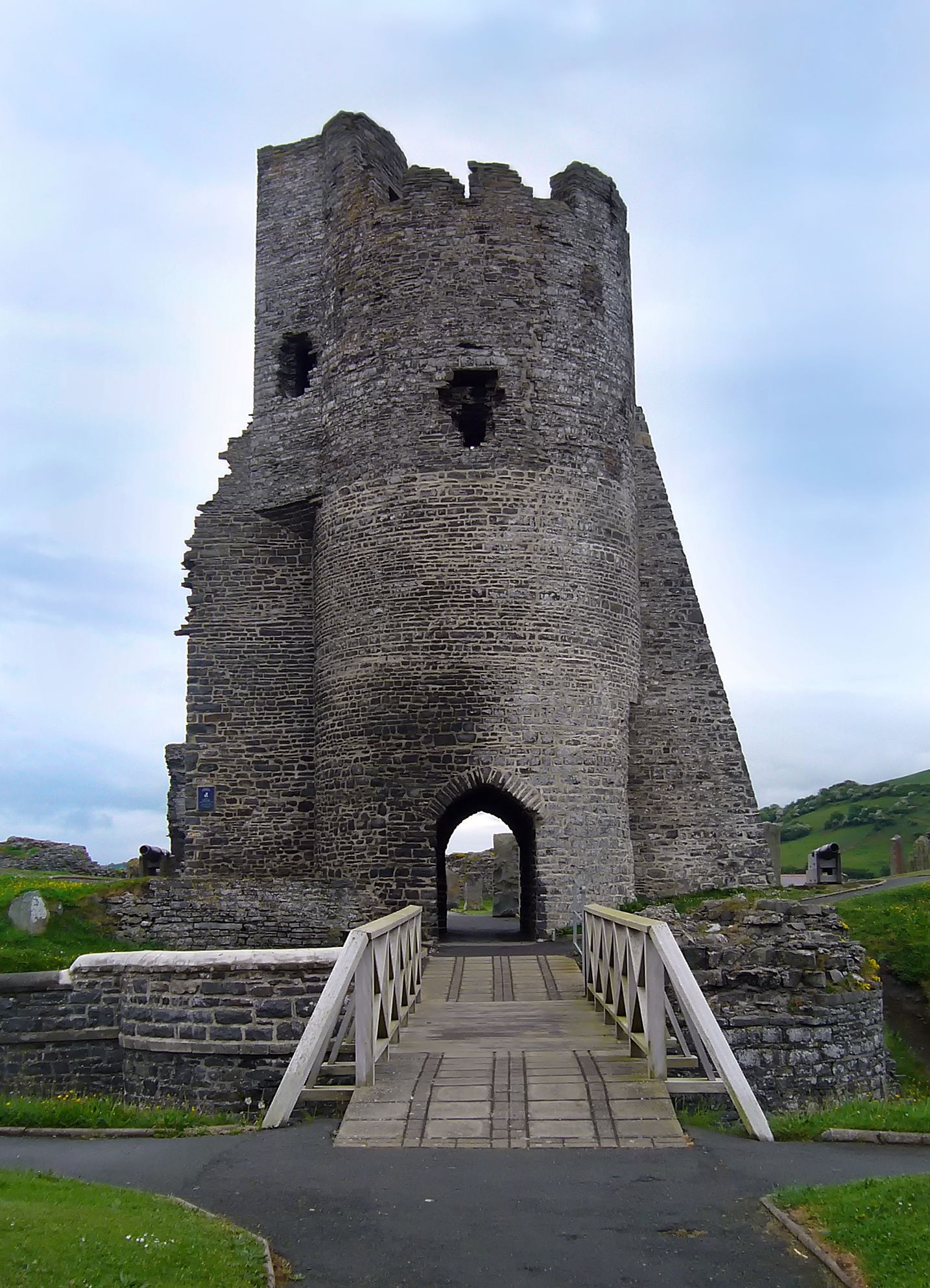
Remains of the north tower gateway

== See also ==
- Ring of Iron
- Castles in Great Britain and Ireland
- List of castles in Wales

== Bibliography ==
- Breverton, Terry (2012). Owain Glyndwr: The Story of the Last Prince of Wales (Kindle ed.). Amberley Publishing. ISBN 1445614987.
- Bridgeman, George Thomas Orlando (1876). History of the Princes of South Wales. Wigan: Thomas Birch.
- Browne, David (16 December 2009). "7: Builth Castle and Aberystwyth Castle". In Williams, Diane; Kenyon, John R. (eds.). The Impact of the Edwardian Castles in Wales. Oxbow Books. ISBN 978-1-78297-367-6.
- Chadwick, Nora Kershaw (1958). Studies in the Early British Church. CUP Archive.
- Evans, G.E. (1915). "The Royal Mint, Aberystwyth". Transactions of the Cardiganshire Antiquarian Society. 2 (1): 71.
- Freeman, M (2011). Aberystwyth - A History And Celebration. Reigate: The Francis Frith Collection. ISBN 9781845896096.
- Gravett, Christopher; Hook, Adam (2007). The castles of Edward I in Wales, 1277-1307. Oxford: Osprey. ISBN 9781846030277.
- Griffiths, Ralph A. (2018). The Principality of Wales in the Later Middle Ages: The Structure and Personnel of Government: South Wales 1277-1536. University of Wales Press. ISBN 978-1-78683-266-5.
- Ixer, R. A.; Browne, D. M. (2017). "Excavations at Tan-y-Castell (the first castle of Aberystwyth) – a re-evaluation. Part 1: the pottery". Archaeology in Wales. 56: 36–60.
- Kenyon, John R. (2010). The medieval castles of Wales. Cardiff: University of Wales press. ISBN 9780708321805.
- Lea, Anne Elizabeth (1995). Contextualizing the "gorhoffeddau": A study in the intellectual background of two medieval Welsh poems (PhD thesis). Harvard University.
- "Aberystwyth Castle (86)". Coflein. RCAHMW.
- "Castell Tan y Bwlch Castle (301795)". Coflein. RCAHMW.
