= Twthill, Rhuddlan =

Norman castle in Denbighshire, Wales

Twthill Castle
- Rhuddlan, Denbighshire, Wales
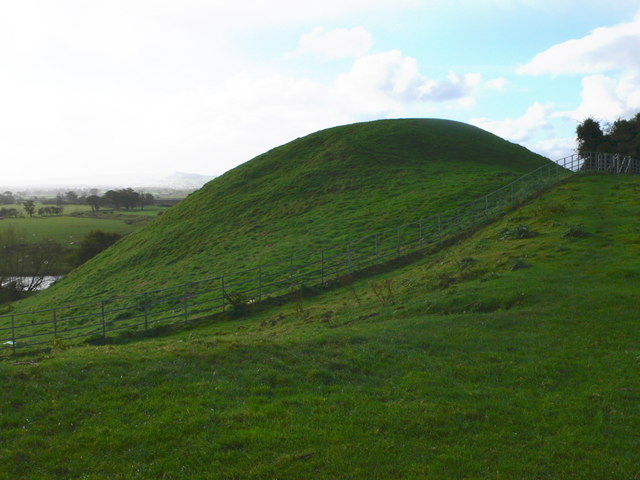
- Twthill Castle

Site information
- Type: Motte and bailey
- Owner: Cadw
- Open to the public: Yes
- Condition: Earthworks remain

Location
- Shown within Wales
- Location within Wales
- Coordinates: 53.2864°N 3.4625°W
- Grid reference: grid reference SJ026776

Twthill (Welsh: Twtil) is a Norman motte-and-bailey castle located near Rhuddlan, Denbighshire in North Wales. The earth and timber castle was built during the Norman invasion of Wales in the late 11th century. It was superseded by the much larger, stone-built Rhuddlan Castle which was built 200 years later during the Conquest of Wales by Edward I in the late 13th century.

The historic names for the site include Toothill or Tot Hill; it has also been referred to as Old Rhuddlan Castle. The only remaining parts are the large mound of the motte, and traces of the wall that surrounded the bailey.

== History ==
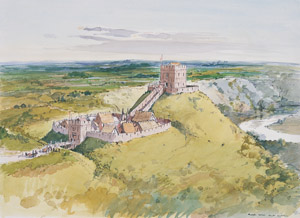
Reconstruction of Twthill Castle in the 11th century

Twthill castle was built to a 'motte and bailey' design and was erected by Robert of Rhuddlan in 1073. He was a kinsman of Hugh d'Avranches, Earl of Chester and the castle was designed to consolidate Norman advances into the north of Wales at the command of William the Conqueror. Using this castle as a base, Robert subdued the Welsh and established control of much of North Wales. A borough became established beside the castle and by 1086, eighteen burgesses enjoying special privileges lived here, and the buildings included a church and a mint. Coins minted at Rhuddlan between this date and 1215 can be found in museum collections.

In July 1157 King Henry II of England was marching to Twthill when he was ambushed at the Battle of Ewloe by an army led by sons of the Tywysog Owain Gwynedd. In the fighting that caused heavy losses for the English and claimed the lives of several prominent nobles, Henry was almost killed as well.

The motte and bailey castle remained in use for two hundred years until Rhuddlan Castle was built adjacent to the site, on the orders of Edward I. Tradition has it that Twthill Castle was built on the site of the palace of Gruffydd ap Llywelyn, king of Wales.

== Preservation ==
Twthill is located some 300 yards south of the later, stone-built Rhuddlan Castle. The only major earthwork is the motte which stands 12 metres high with a maximum diameter of 80 metres, light impressions of the bailey can be seen in the surrounding fields. Much of the site has degraded due to the sandy soil conditions.

Twthill is currently in the care of Cadw and is open to the public all year round. Admission is free and the castle is accessed via a 400-metre public footpath across agricultural land.

== See also ==
- Castles in Great Britain and Ireland
- List of castles in Wales
