= Battle of Ewloe =

Battle fought in July 1157 between Henry II of England and Prince Owain Gwynedd

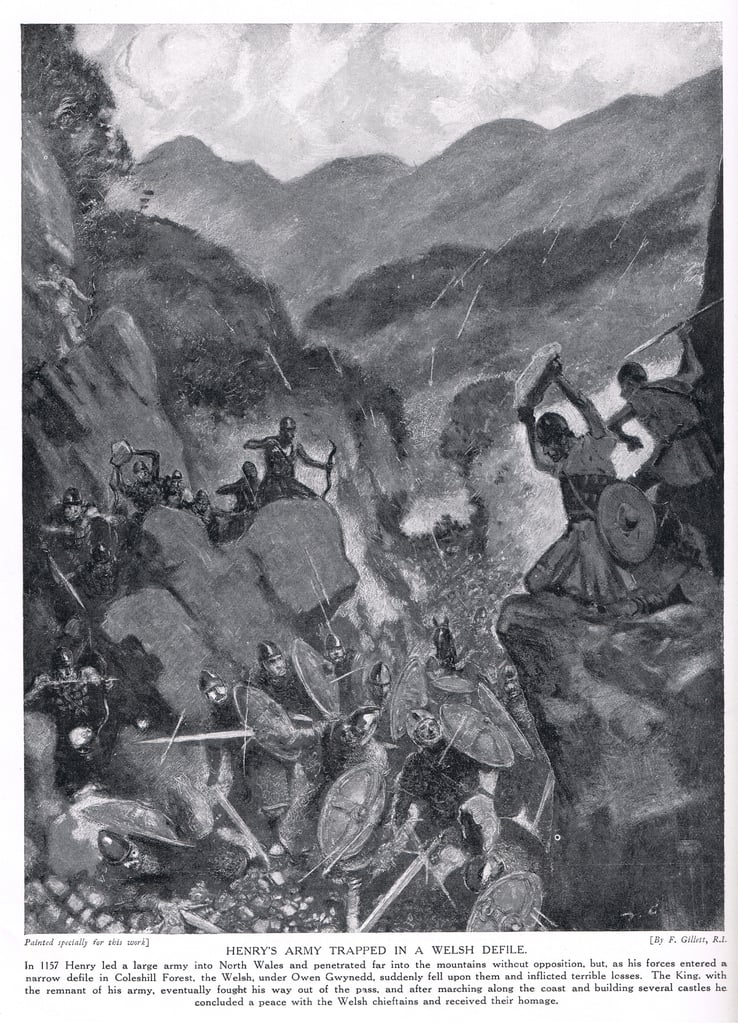
- Edward Frank Gillett: Henry's army trapped in a Welsh defile (c. 1920)
Date	1157
Location	Ewloe wood (near Flintshire)
Result	Welsh victory

Belligerents
Kingdom of Gwynedd	Kingdom of England and Welsh allies

Commanders and leaders
Owain Gwynedd; Dafydd ab Owain Gwynedd; Cynan ab Owain Gwynedd	King Henry II; Henry FitzRoy † (Naval expedition)

Strength
Unknown; see Forces involved	Unknown; see Forces involved

Casualties and losses
Unknown	Heavy casualties in the outflanking force Eustace fitz John; Henry FitzRoy

The Battle of Ewloe (also known as the Battle of Coleshill, or Counsylth, or Coleshille, or Cennadlog) was fought in July 1157 between the Anglo-Norman forces of King Henry II of England and an army led by the Welsh Tywysog Owain Gwynedd, near Ewloe in what is now Flintshire, north-east Wales, although the precise location of the battle is still a matter of scholarly debate. The battle was part of Henry's campaign to reassert control over Welsh territories and the Welsh Marches following his accession to the throne in 1154.

In an attempt to outflank Owain's defensive position, Henry led a detachment through the woods of Hawarden, where he was ambushed by an awaiting Welsh force, commanded by Owain's sons Dafydd and Cynan. The English suffered significant losses, including the death of the prominent noble Eustace fitz John. Both English and Welsh contemporary sources report a severe setback for Henry's forces, which included the royal standard being dropped and a near escape by the king himself. Although Owain ultimately withdrew and agreed to a peace settlement, the battle was regarded by many contemporary chroniclers as a tactical failure for Henry.

The battle has been commemorated locally with a plaque, unveiled in 2008.

== Background ==
Owain Gwynedd had succeeded his father Gruffudd ap Cynan in 1137 and expanded his holdings eastward into the disputed region of Tegeingl (now northeast Wales). This area had been largely under Anglo-Norman control for several generations.

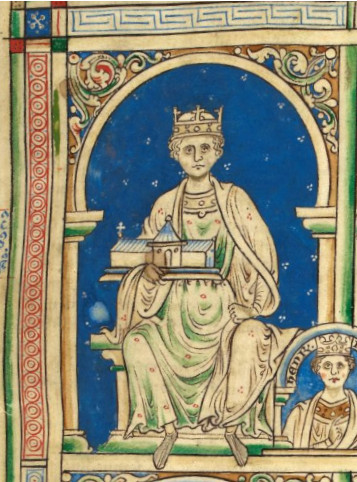
Henry II as depicted in a manuscript copy of Matthew Paris' Historia Anglorum

Following his coronation in 1154, Henry II sought to reassert royal authority over Wales and reverse Owain’s recent territorial gains. The king assembled a considerable army in Chester, supported by allies including Madog ap Maredudd of Powys, and Owain’s brother Cadwaladr ap Gruffudd (whom Owain had recently stripped of his lands in Ceredigion).

== Forces involved ==
According to William Stubbs, Henry's army may have included as much as one third of the knights in England, based on his interpretation of contemporary sources. John Edward Lloyd suggests this was a "greatly reduced" levy, its smaller size enabling Henry to afford to pay his soldiers for a longer term of service. The Pipe Rolls state that the King's army was supplemented with archers and a naval force, reflecting a significant logistical investment in the campaign. Henry's fleet, allegedly commanded by Henry FitzRoy, the illegitimate son of Henry I, eventually landed at Anglesey, but its intended purpose is unclear.

The size of the Welsh force is unknown, though one version of the Brut y Tywysogion states that Owain's army was ten times smaller than Henry's.

== Location ==
Owain adopted a forward defensive position near Coleshill in anticipation of Henry’s westward advance. The exact location of this defensive position—and the battle itself—are still disputed. Historians D. J. Cathcart King and Sean Davies suggest the site was near Basingwerk, but John Edwards proposes a location further east, at Hen Blas.

== Battle ==
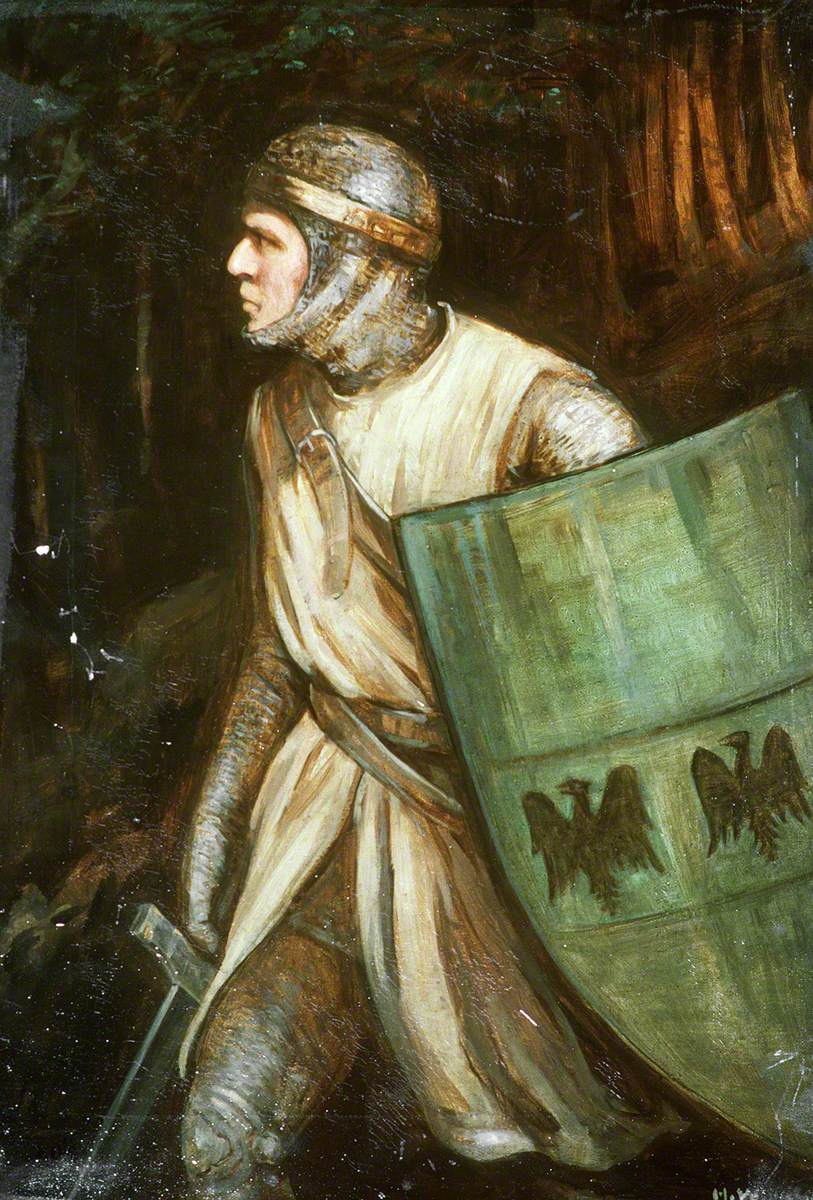
Owain Gwynedd as depicted by Hugh Williams, 1909

According to the Brut y Tywysogion, Owain appears to have expected a pitched battle and took steps to fortify his position. Henry sent the majority of his force towards Owain's entrenched army, but himself led a lighter flanking force through the wooded terrain of Hawarden. Anticipating such a manoeuvre, Owain had stationed a defensive force there under his sons Dafydd ab Owain Gwynedd and Cynan ab Owain Gwynedd.

In the ensuing ambush, English losses were heavy. Among the English dead was Eustace fitz John, Constable of Chester. During the conflict, the royal standard was dropped by the standard-bearer Henry of Essex, leading some to believe the king had fallen. According to the chronicle of Jocelyn de Brakelond, who allegedly based his account of the battle on testimony from Henry of Essex himself, it was Roger, Earl of Hertford who retrieved the standard and prevented the King's death.

Interpretations of King Henry's response vary. Barbier states that Henry "escaped with difficulty", Cathcart King and Edwards argue that the king pushed through and outflanked Owain’s main line, whereas Hosler suggests he was forced to retreat and regroup. The Brut y Tywysogion suggests Owain feared a double envelopment and withdrew.

== Aftermath ==
Henry continued to Twthill, Rhuddlan where he learned that his naval expedition had failed. The fleet had landed on Anglesey and proceeded to raid the island, but was then repelled and defeated by local defenders; its commander, Henry FitzRoy, was killed.

Owain ultimately surrendered Tegeingl to Henry and restored Cadwaladr’s lands in Ceredigion. However, the extent to which Owain submitted to the English king remains debated. Non-Welsh sources describe him paying homage, but the Brut y Tywysogion only records a peace agreement between the two. Owain continued to use royal titles after the battle, which historian Huw Pryce interprets as a sign that Owain “implicitly rejected [Henry's] royal overlordship”. In 1160, Owain wrote to King Louis VII of France asserting he had inflicted greater losses on Henry's army.
