= Peter Smith (Welsh footballer) =

Welsh footballer

Personal information
- Date of birth: 18 September 1978 (age 48)
- Place of birth: Rhuddlan, Wales
- Height: 5 ft 10 in (1.78 m)
- Position: Forward

Senior career*
Years	Team	Apps	(Gls)
1996–2001	Crewe Alexandra	22	(0)
1998	→ Macclesfield Town (loan)	12	(3)
2001	→ Telford United (loan)	1	(0)
2001–2003	Telford United	69	(10)
2003–2004	Newtown	32	(13)
2004–2005	Rhyl	23	(5)
2005–2006	Newtown	21	(4)
2006–2007	Colwyn Bay	?	(?)
Total		180	(35)
- * Club domestic league appearances and goals

Peter Smith (born 18 September 1978) is a Welsh former professional footballer who played as a forward for several teams in the Football League.
