= Ring of Iron =

Chain of fortifications in Wales

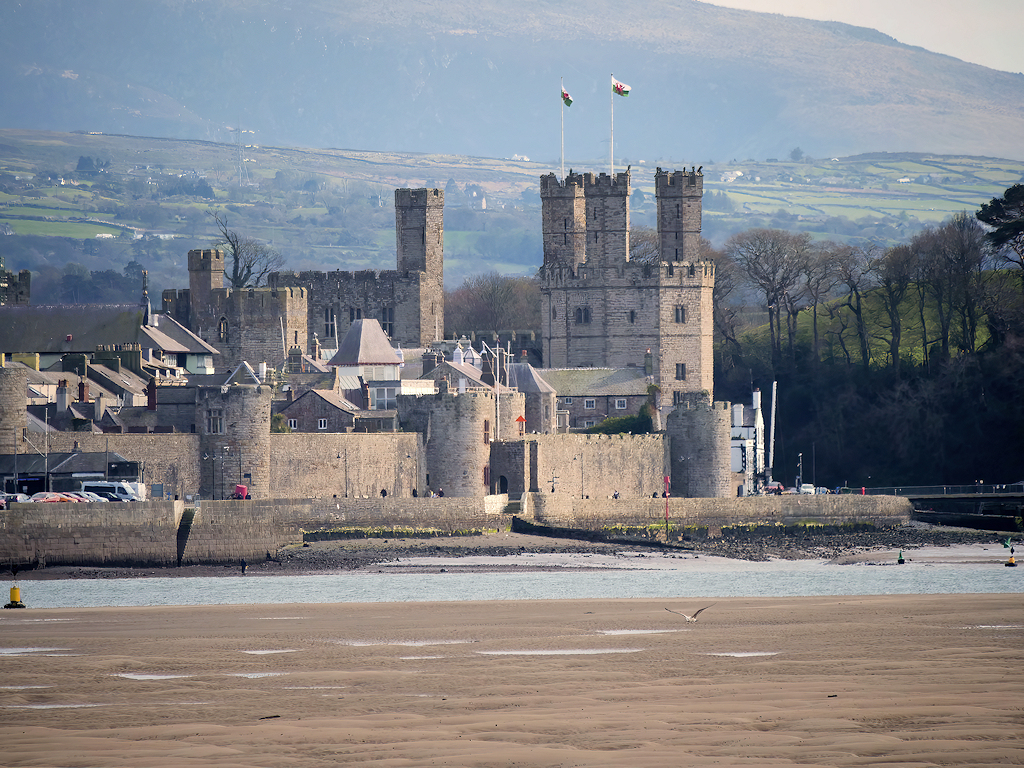
The castle and walled town of Caernarfon

Castles of the Iron Ring.
List in approximate order of building.
- 1. Flint Castle
- 2. Hawarden Castle
- 3. Rhuddlan Castle
- 4. Builth Castle
- 5. Aberystwyth Castle
- 6. Denbigh Castle
- 7. Caernarfon Castle
- 8. Conwy Castle
- 9. Harlech Castle
- 10. Beaumaris Castle

The Ring of Iron (Welsh: Cylch Haearn) or Iron Ring of Castles was a chain of fortifications and castles built across Wales at Edward I's command after the death of Llywelyn ap Gruffudd in 1282 and the subsequent Conquest of Wales by Edward I of England. Edward spent over £80,000 on all of the castles, with £20,000 being incurred just by Rhuddlan Castle, Aberystwyth Castle, Flint Castle, and Builth Castle.

The purpose of building the iron ring of castles was to control the native Welsh population, particularly in Gwynedd, which had been the main focus of resistance to the English crown for centuries. The jewel in the crown of the Iron Ring was Caernarfon Castle, which Edward intended to be his seat in Gwynedd and where he arranged for his son Edward II to be born.

Many of the castles begun after the end of the war in 1282 were the work of master architect James of Saint George. Most castles were built with an integrated fortified town, as can still be seen at Denbigh. This idea of providing a fortified town was likely from Gascony in southwest France, where they are called bastides. Some towns, such as Rhuddlan, were not encircled in stone and instead were surrounded by wooden palisades and earthworks. By populating the bastides with English settlers, Edward created an outpost of England within Wales; Welsh were permitted to enter the town unarmed during the day but not to trade.

In July 2017, plans for an iron sculpture of a giant ring were announced as part of the £630,000 restoration project of Flint Castle, the first castle built in Wales by Edward I. This plan was met with criticism, and accusations were made that it was commemorating the Edwardian conquest of Wales, a contentious event among the Welsh public. Following a petition, plans for the sculpture were ultimately cancelled

== See also ==
- Castles and Town Walls of King Edward in Gwynedd (a World Heritage Site)

== Gallery of the Iron Ring of Castles ==
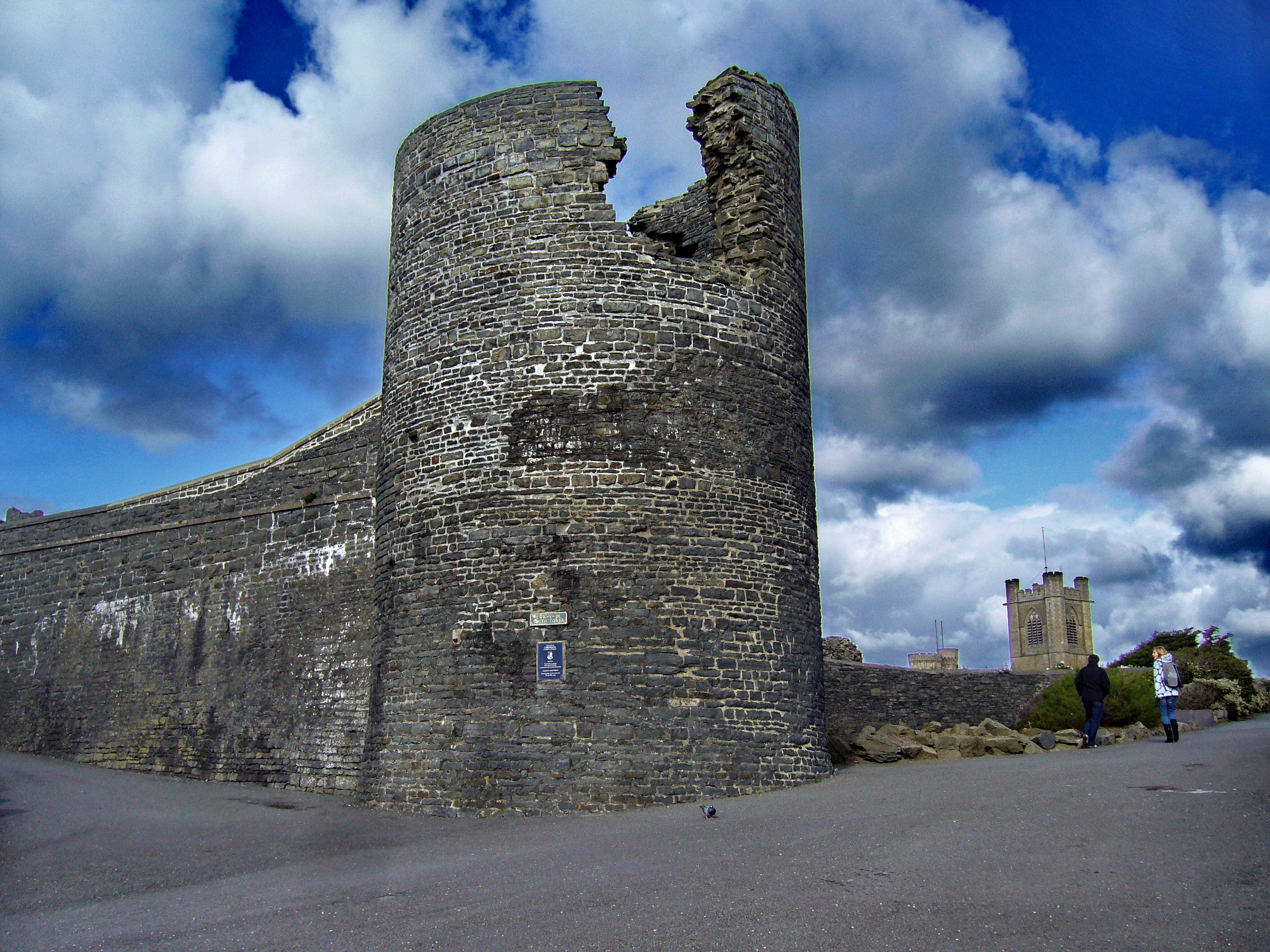
Aberystwyth Castle (1277)

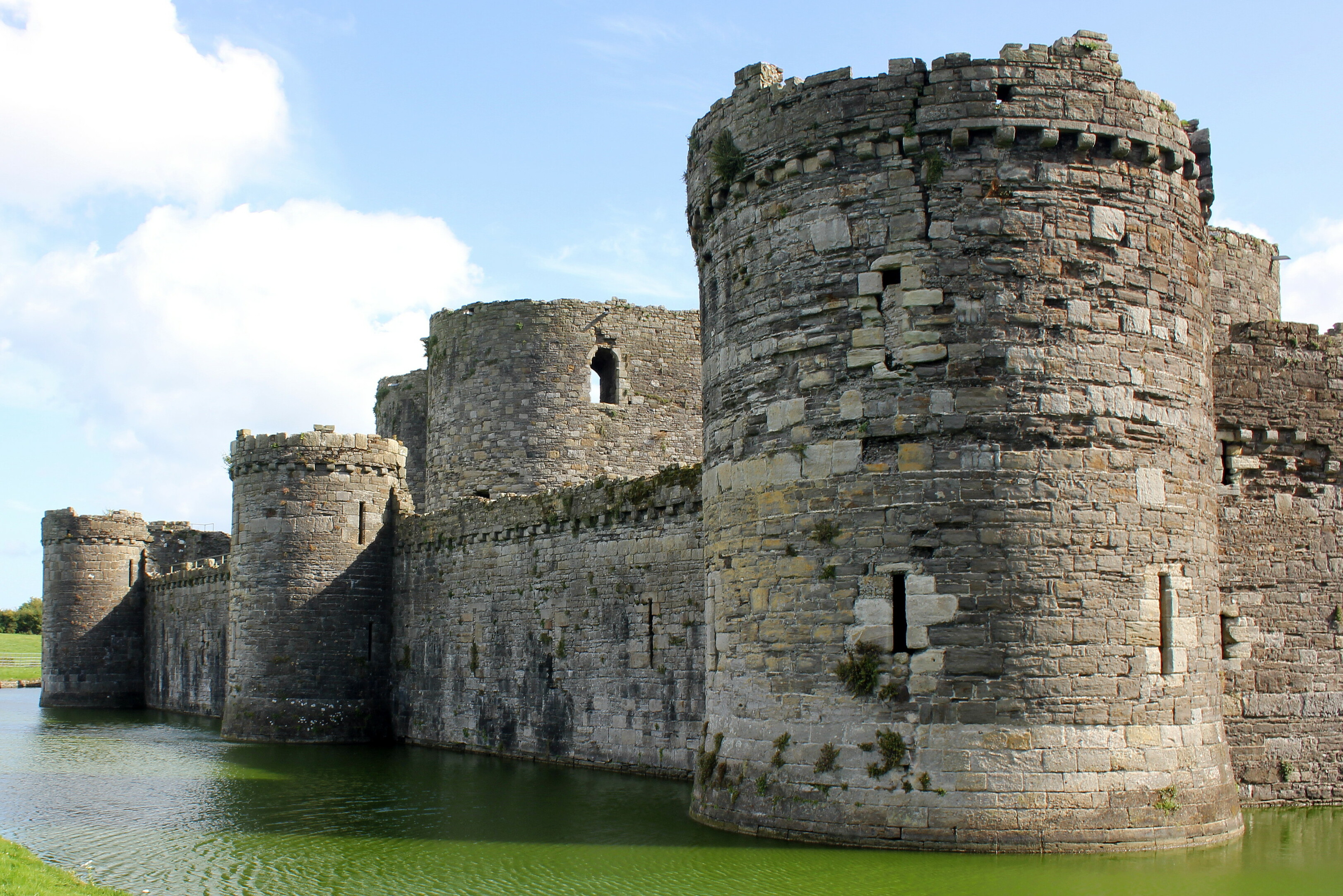
Beaumaris Castle (1295)

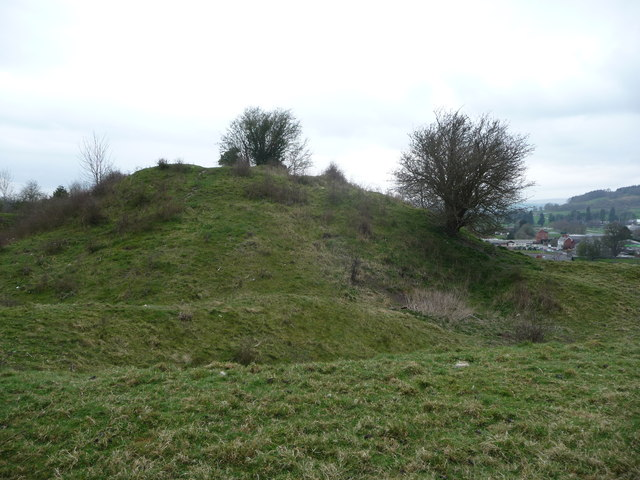
Builth Castle (masonry removed) (1277)

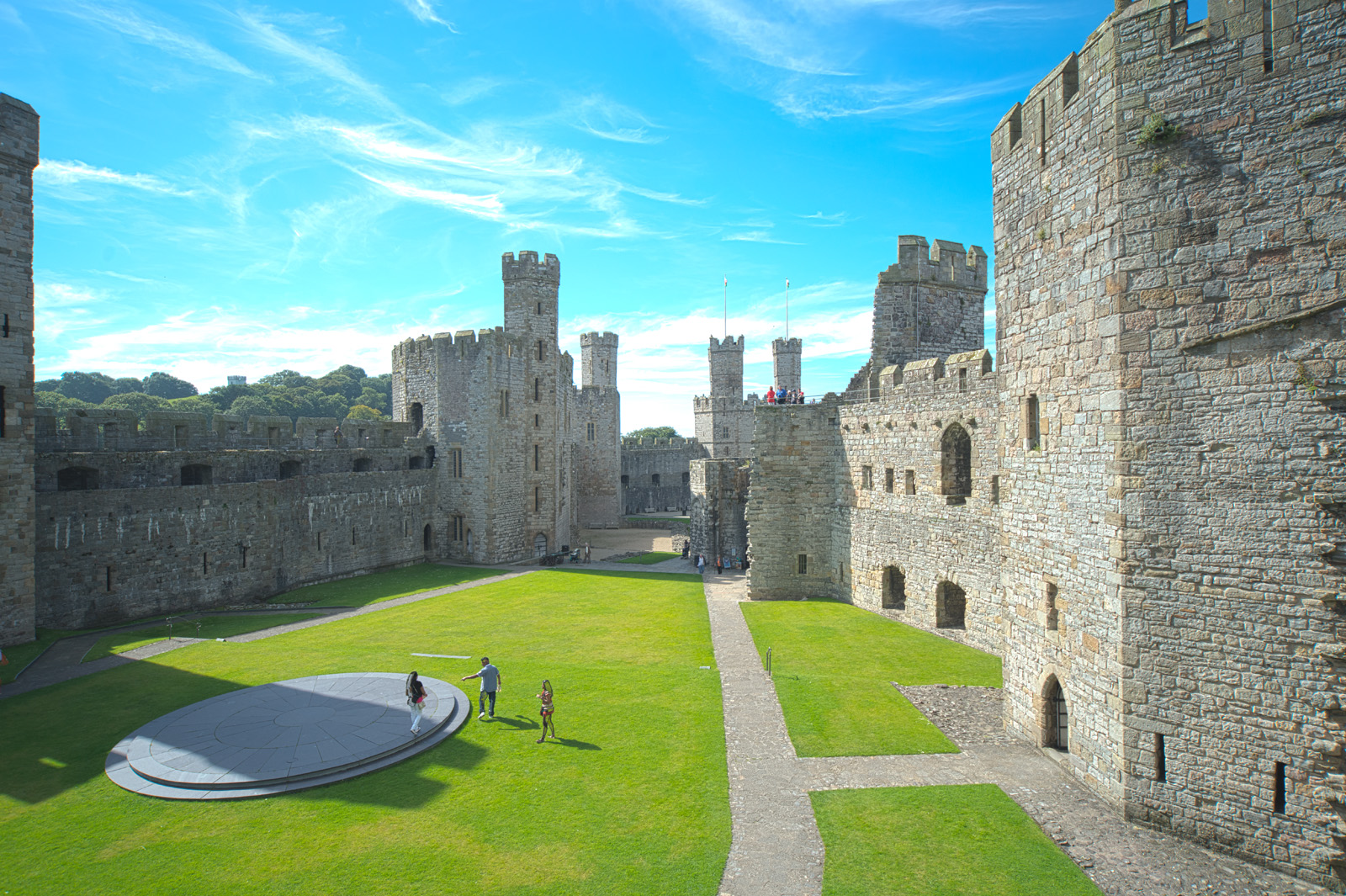
Caernarfon Castle (1283)

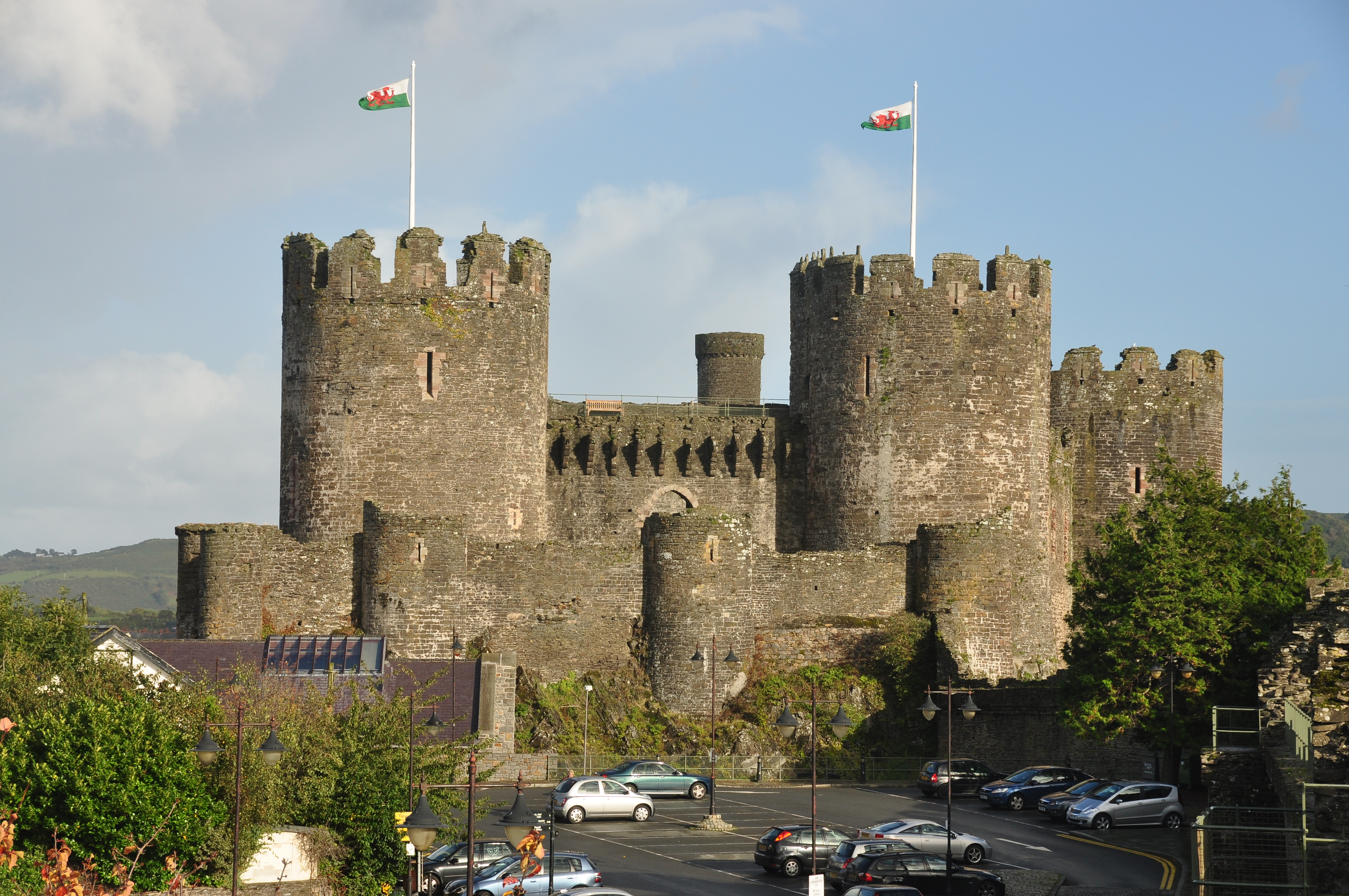
Conwy Castle (1283)

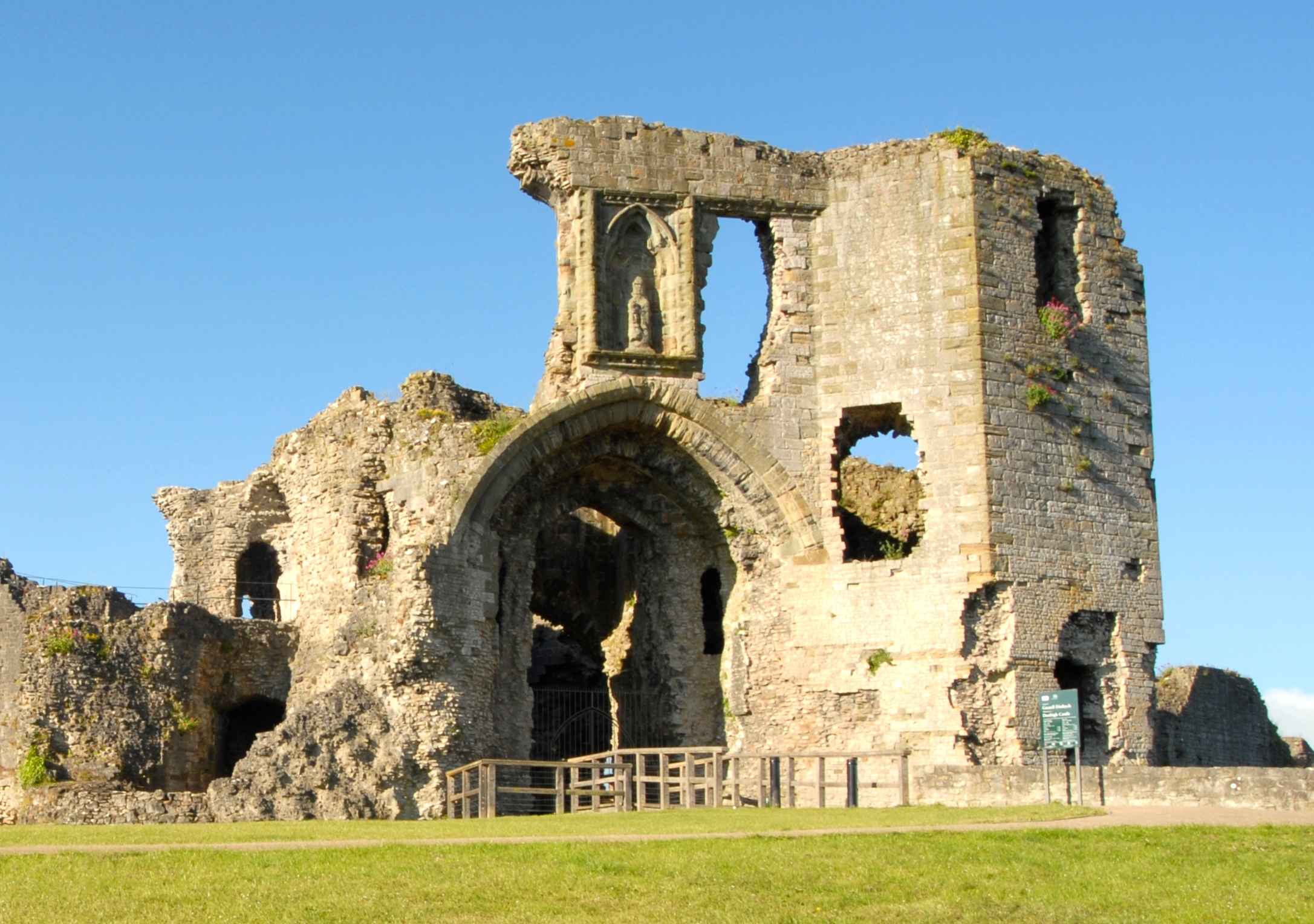
Denbigh Castle (1283)

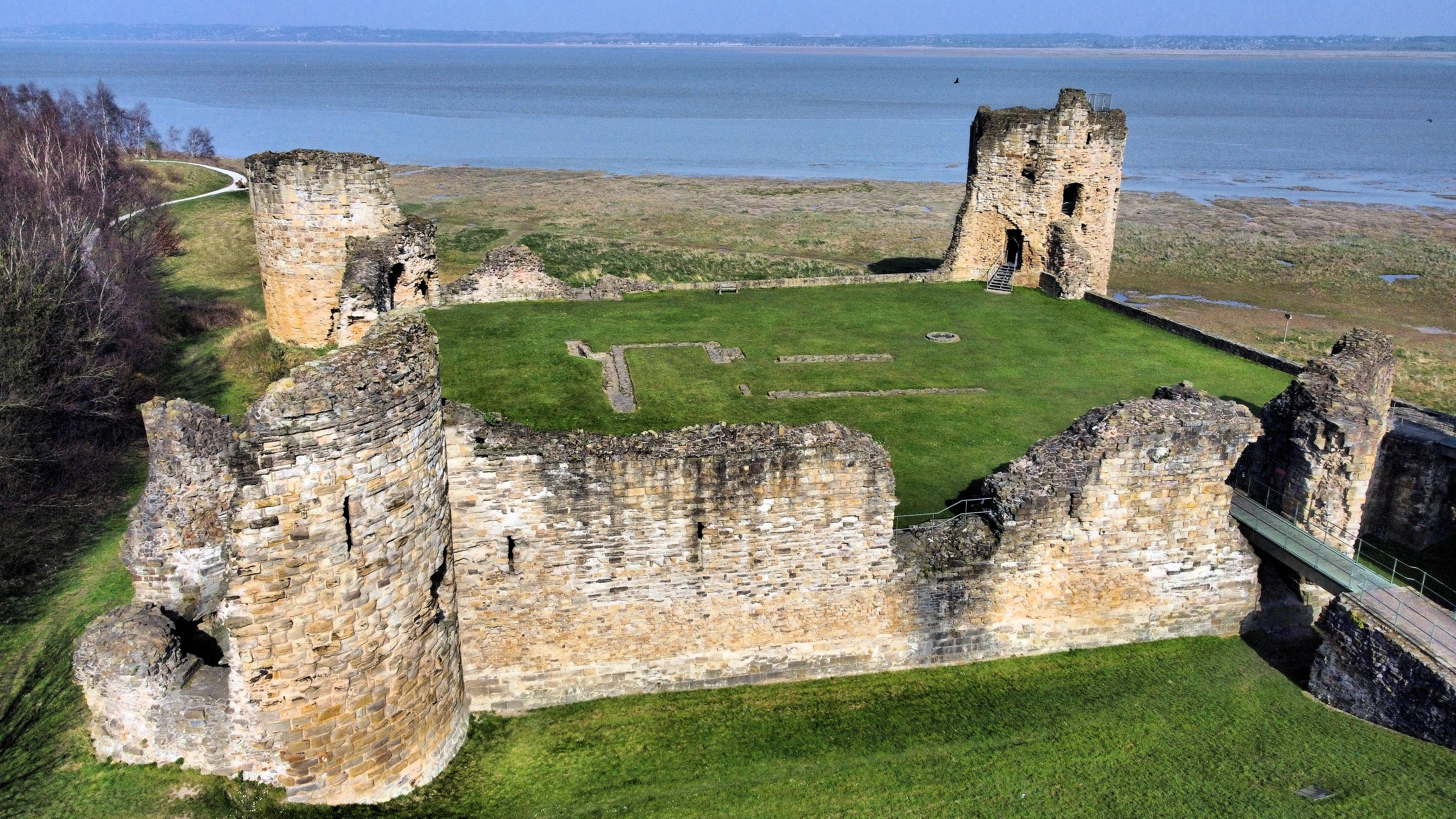
Flint Castle (1277)

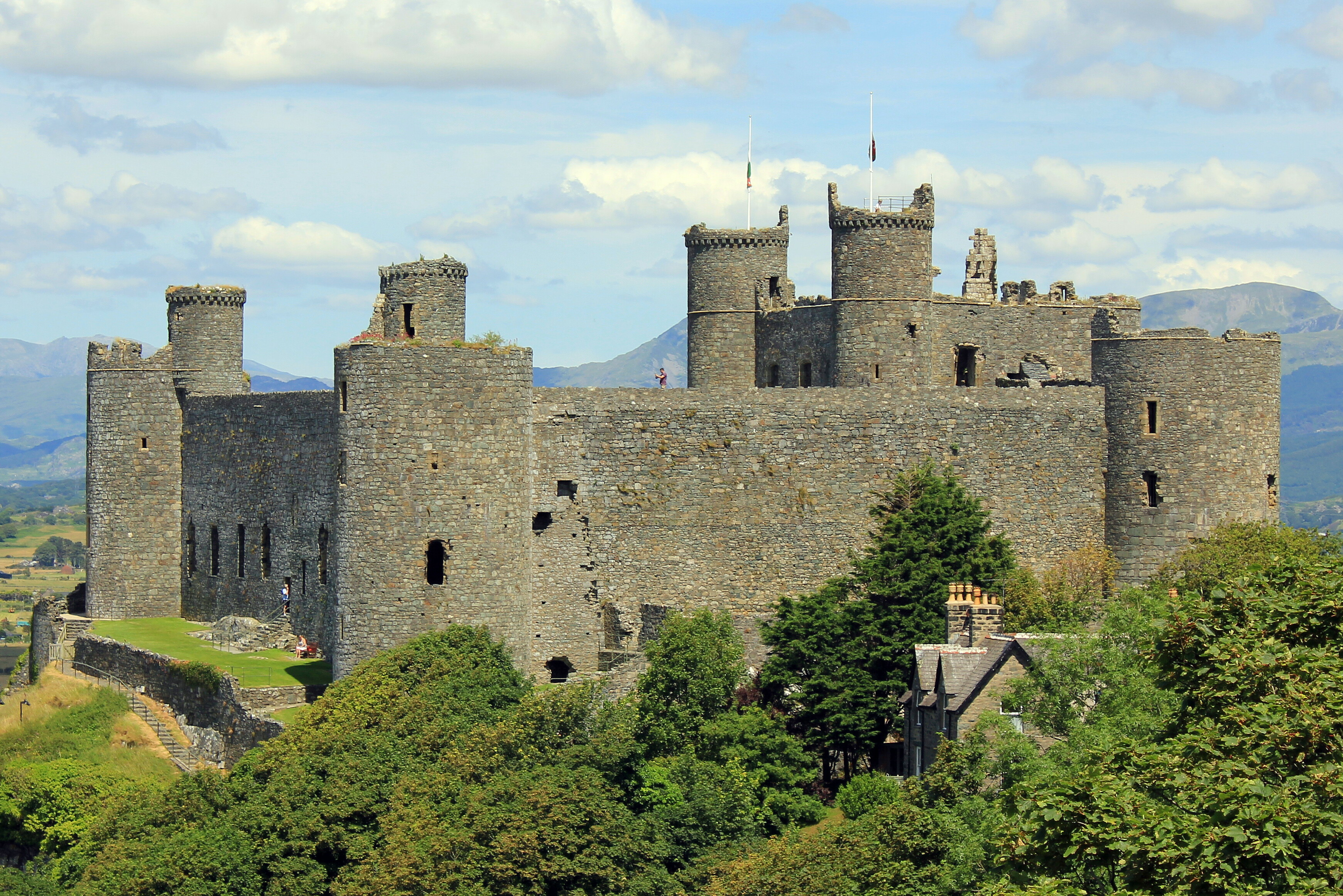
Harlech Castle (1283)

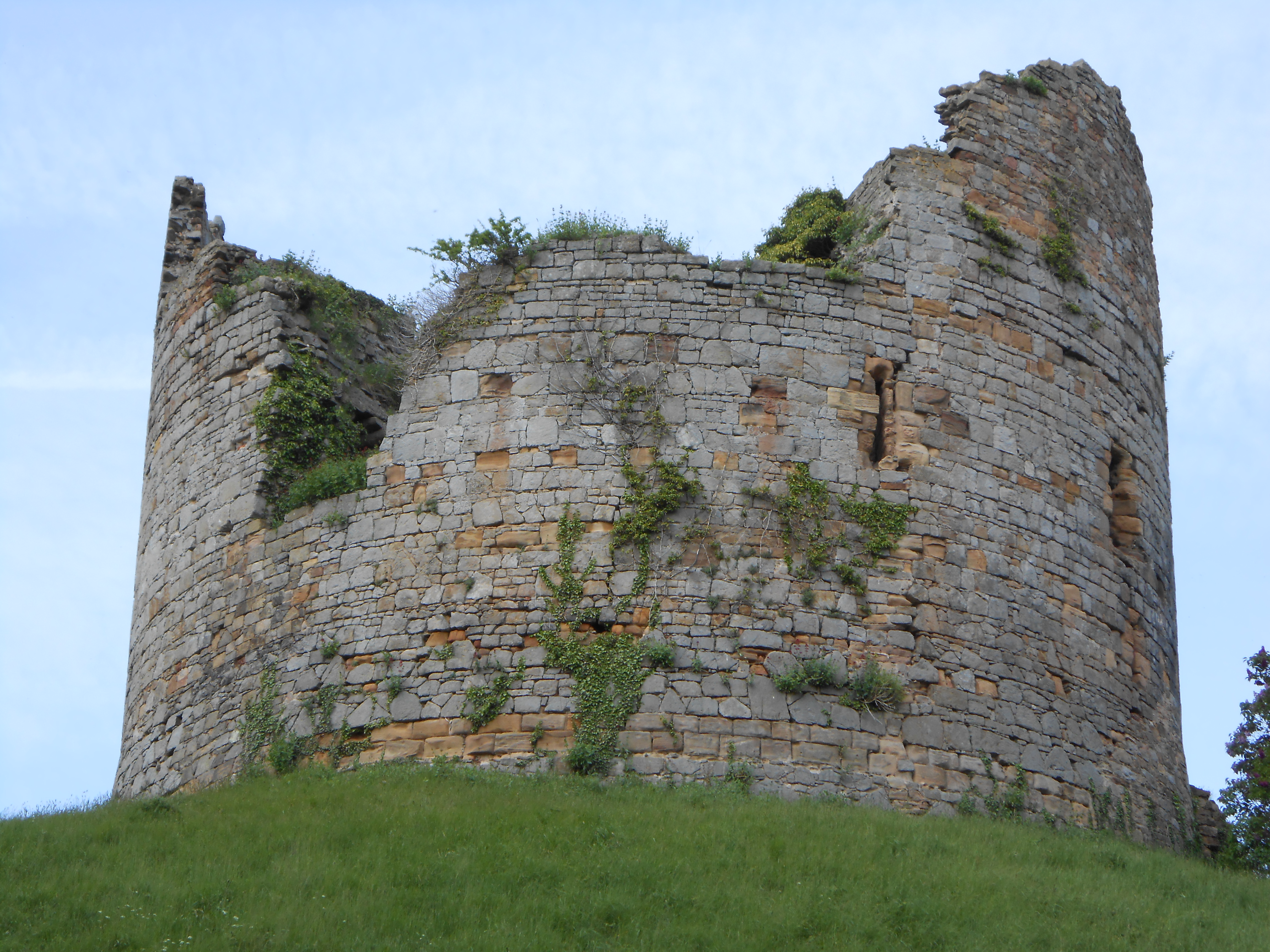
Hawarden Castle (1277)

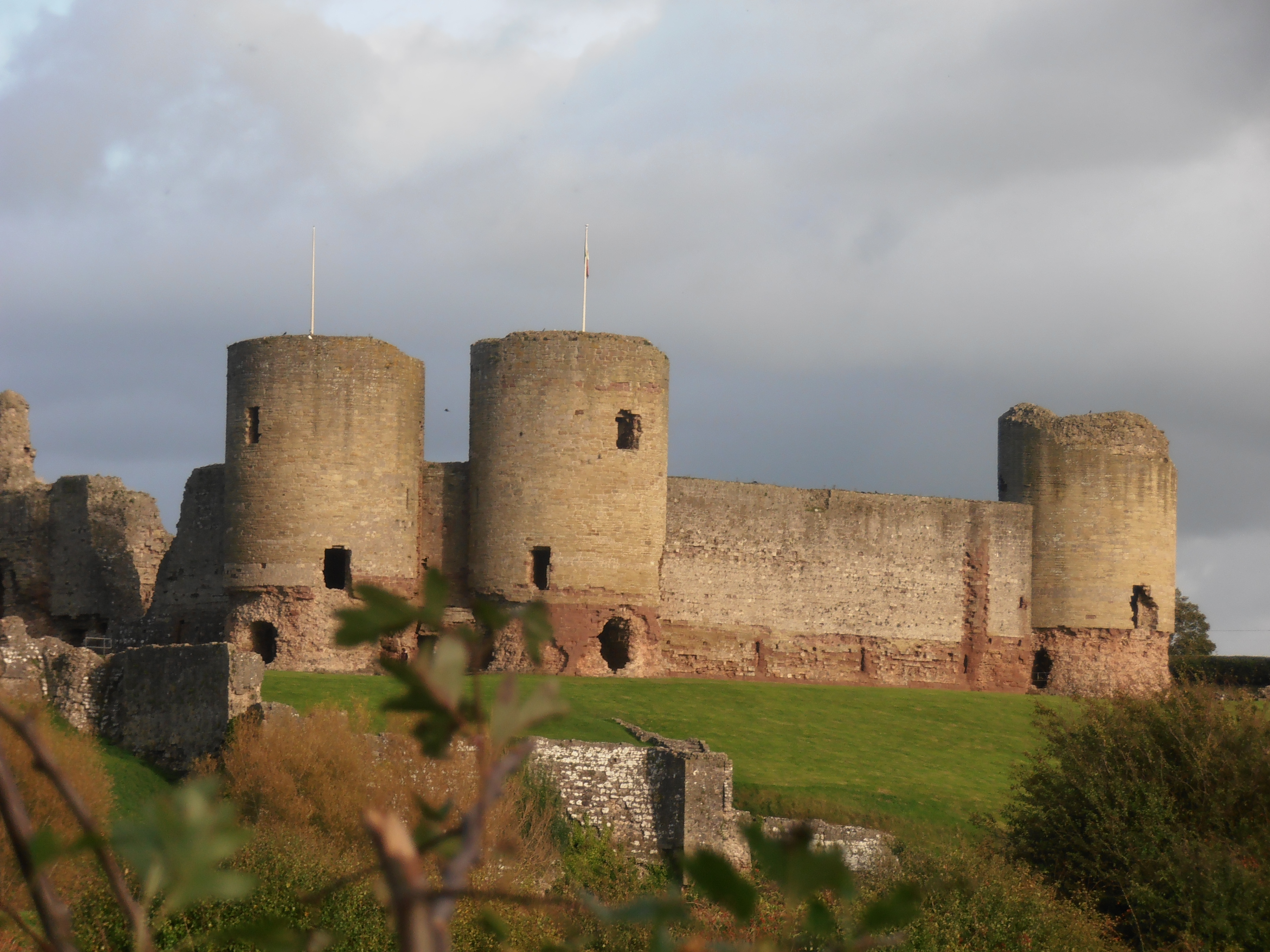
Rhuddlan Castle (1277)
