= Thomas Bushell (mining engineer) =

17th-century English engineer

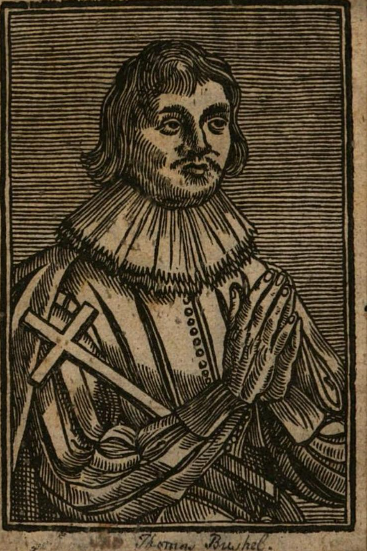
Thomas Bushell

Thomas Bushell (c. 1593 – 1674) was a servant of Francis Bacon who went on to become a mining engineer and defender of Lundy Island for the Royalist cause during the Civil War. He had an interest in solitary and penitential living which has led him to be identified as a forerunner of the secular hermits of the Georgian period.

Thomas Bushell was born around 1593 and was a servant of Bacon's from around 1608 until Bacon's impeachment (when he was a cause of charges of corruption being brought against Bacon). After Bacon's death Bushell moved to the south west of England becoming a mining engineer and master of the mint. He took up residence in Lundy which he defended for the Royalists during the Civil War. Lundy was the last place to surrender at the end of the Civil War.

== Life ==
He was a younger son of a family living at Cleve Prior in Worcestershire. At the age of 15 he entered the service of Sir Francis Bacon, and later acted as his seal-bearer or secretary. When Bacon became lord chancellor, Bushell accompanied him to court.

Bacon instructed Bushell on minerals, by his account; Bacon also paid off his debts. On Bacon's disgrace Bushell adopted an ascetic vegetarian diet and retired to the Isle of Wight, where he lived for some time disguised as a fisherman. He returned to London; but on his master's death in 1626 he lived for three years in a hut on the Calf of Man.

Bushell came to live in Oxfordshire, where he had an estate at Road Enstone, near Woodstock. There he found a spring and rock formation, which he made into an attraction as a grotto, forming the basis of the 'Enstone Marvels', demolished in 1836. Charles I paid Bushell an unexpected visit there. On a subsequent royal visit in 1636 the rock was presented to Queen Henrietta Maria in a kind of masque, for which Bushell himself provided some verse (see The Several Speeches and Songs at the Presentment of the Rock at Enston, Oxon. 1636). In 1635 Bushell's was granted a soap monopoly; in January 1637 he had the grant of the royal mines in Wales.

Mines of Cardiganshire, containing silver mixed with their lead, formed crown property. They had formerly been farmed by Sir Hugh Middleton, who sent the silver which he extracted to be coined at the Royal Mint in the Tower of London. After the death of Middleton the mines were reported to be inundated and in poor condition; Bushell in purchasing the lease proposed to recover the inundated mines, and to employ new methods of mining, with a local mint at castle at Aberystwyth Castle. The mint was established in July 1637 with Bushell as warden and master-worker, and English silver coins of various denominations were issued from it. Bushell recovered several drowned mines, and discovered new branches of old mines.

During the First English Civil War Bushell was a royalist providing finance. He held Lundy Island for the king; but, with the royal sanction, surrendered it on 24 February 1647. He went into hiding; but in August 1652, gave securities to the Council of State for his future good behaviour. He obtained from Oliver Cromwell a renewal of his lease, and a confirmation of his granting the silver he extracted. These privileges were confirmed in February 1658 by Richard Cromwell, who also protected and encouraged Bushell in his operations in connection with the lead mines in the forest of Mendip.

Bushell's mining schemes in Somersetshire received the sanction of Charles II; but little is known of the last few years of his life. It is probable that he had money troubles.

Bushell died in 1674, and was buried in the cloisters of Westminster Abbey. His wife was Anne Browne, widow and second wife of Sir William Waad, lieutenant of the Tower.

== Vegetarianism ==
Bushell was one of the earliest vegetarians in England. For several years as a hermit on the Calf of Man he lived on a strict diet of oil, honey, mustard, herbs, biscuits and water.

== Selected publications ==
- The First Part of Youths Errors (1628)
- Abridgement of the Lord Chancellor Bacon's Philosophical Theory in Mineral Prosecutions (1659)

== See also ==
- Roger Crab
