= Rhuddlan =

Town in Denbighshire, Wales

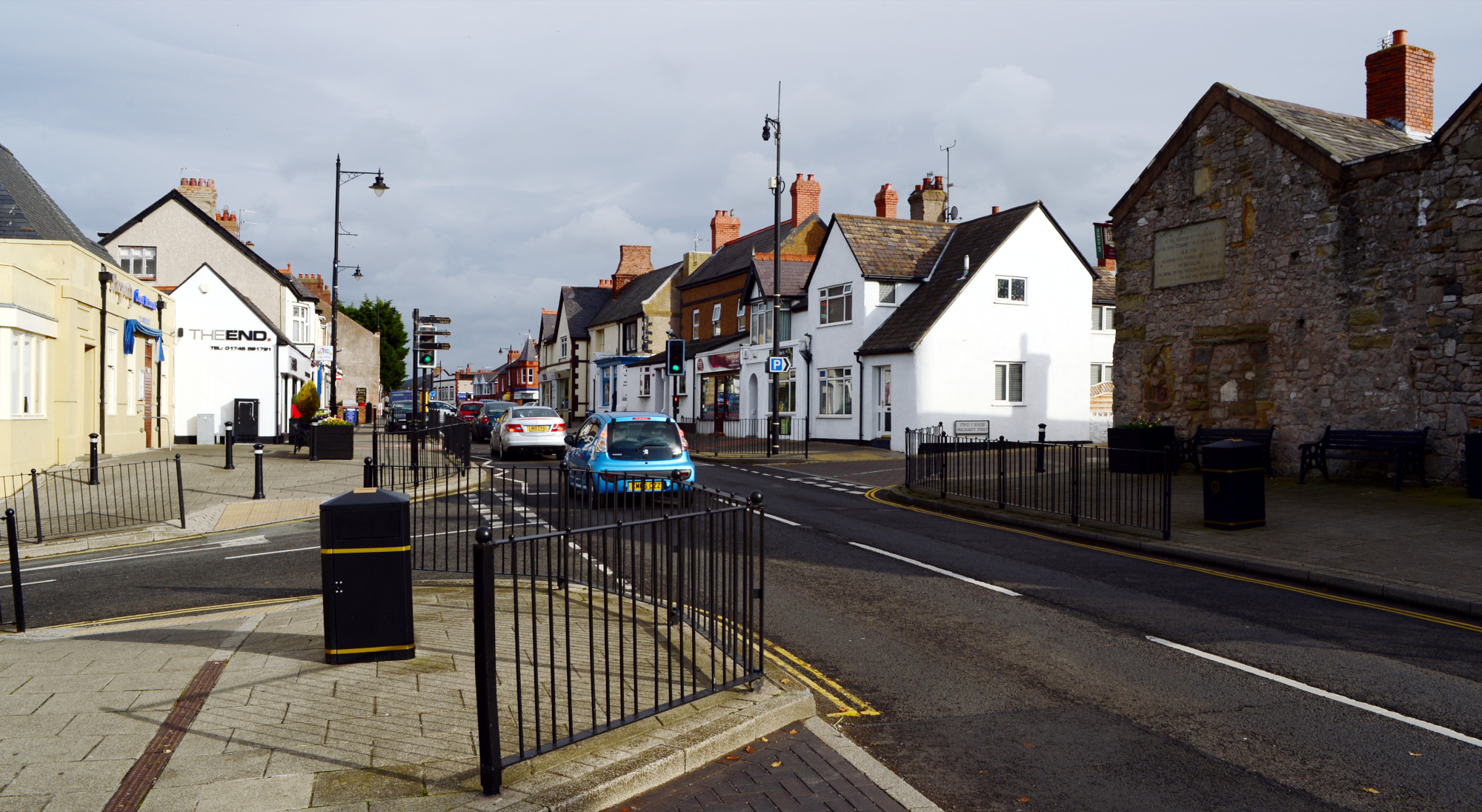
- High Street, Rhuddlan

- Location within Denbighshire
- Population: 3,709 (2011)
- OS grid reference: SJ025785
- Community: Rhuddlan
- Principal area: Denbighshire
- Preserved county: Clwyd
- Country: Wales
- Sovereign state: United Kingdom
- Post town: RHYL
- Postcode district: LL18
- Dialling code: 01745
- Police: North Wales
- Fire: North Wales
- Ambulance: Welsh
- UK Parliament: Clwyd North
- Senedd Cymru – Welsh Parliament: Vale of Clwyd
- Website: rhuddlantowncouncil.gov.uk
- List of places UK Wales Denbighshire 53.294°N 3.464°W Map of the community

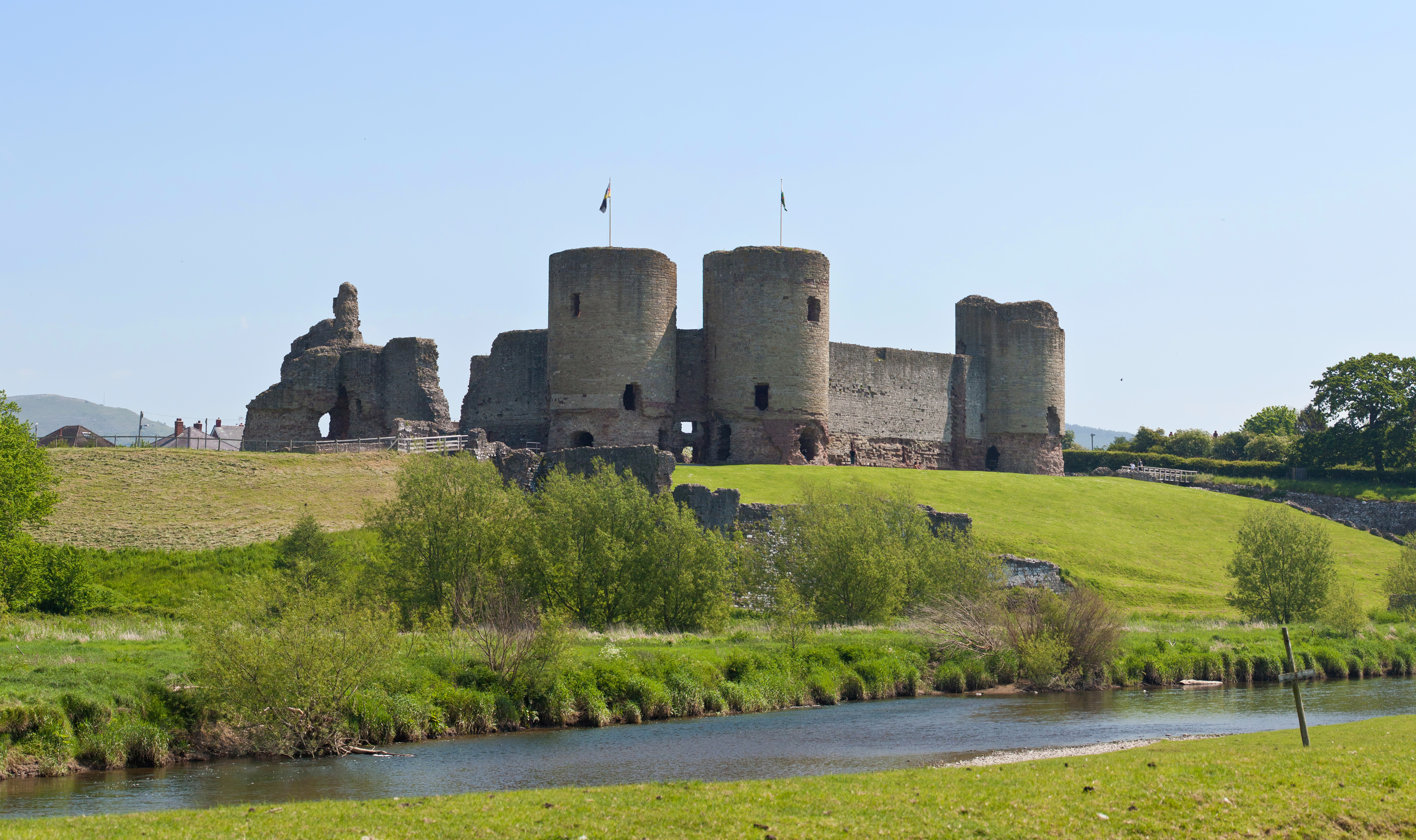
Rhuddlan Castle in May 2012

Rhuddlan (Welsh: [ˈr̥ɨðlan]) is a town, community, and electoral ward in Denbighshire, Wales. Its associated urban zone is mainly on the right bank of the Clwyd; it is directly south of seafront town Rhyl. It gave its name to the Welsh district of Rhuddlan from 1974 to 1996. As of the 2001 census, the population was 4,296 decreasing to 3,709 in the 2011 census. It was historically in Flintshire.

== Etymology ==
The name of the town is a combination of the Welsh words rhudd "red" + glan "riverbank".

== History ==
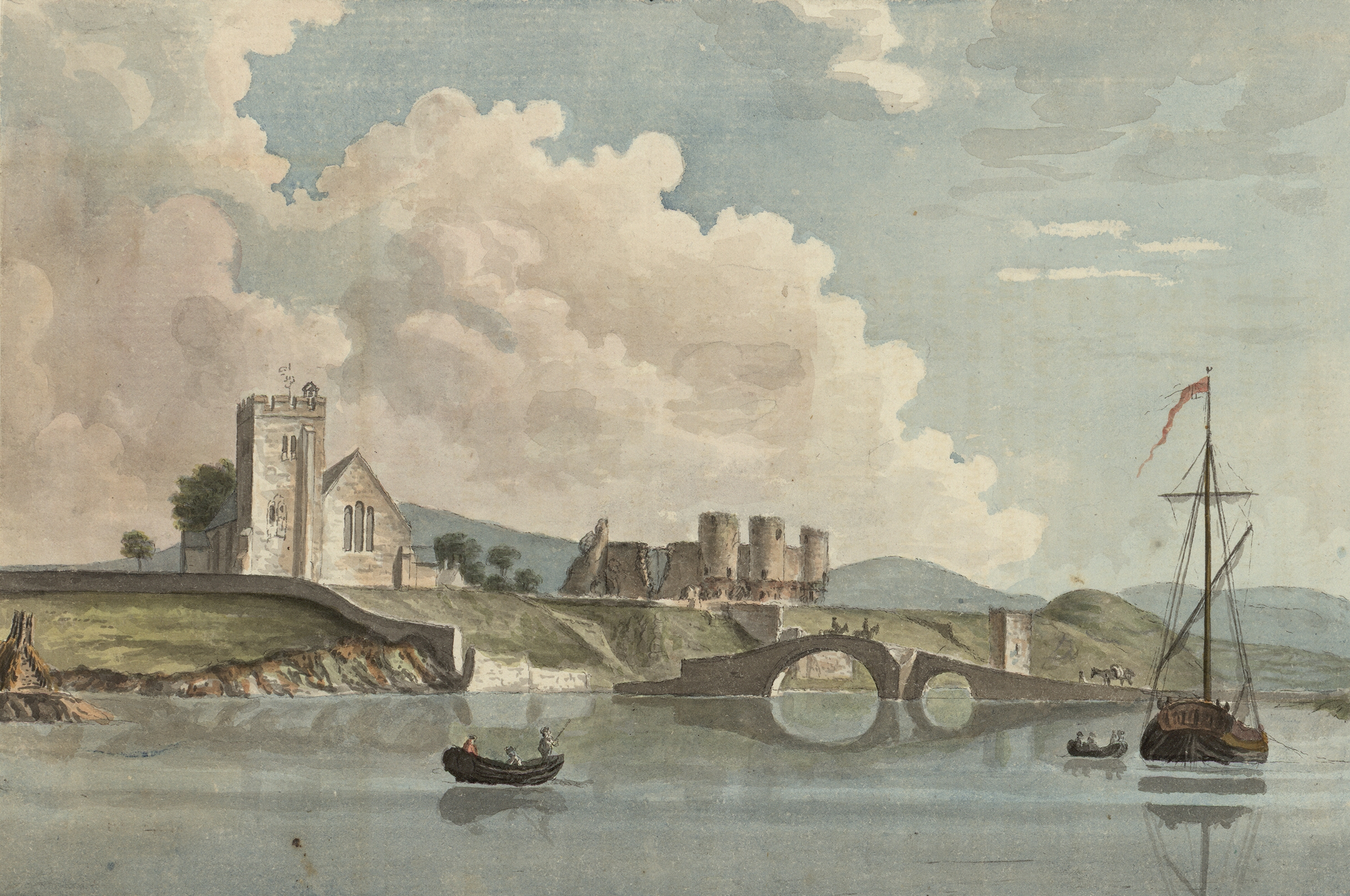
Rhuddlan church and castle, c. 1781

In AD 921, the Anglo-Saxon king, Edward the Elder, founded a burh named Cledematha (mouth of the Clwydd) at Rhuddlan. In the following century, before the Norman Conquest and subsequent Norman occupation of lower Gwynedd, the Perfeddwlad, Rhuddlan was the site of a Welsh cantref and served as the seat of government and capital of Gwynedd for the Welsh king Gruffydd ap Llywelyn (ruled 1055–1063). Following the Conquest, in 1086, Rhuddlan was recorded in the Domesday Book as a small settlement within the hundred of Ati's Cross and in the county of Cheshire.

A mint established at Rhuddlan in the 1180s by Dafydd ab Owain, and later maintained by Llywelyn the Great, was responsible for minting the first native Welsh coinage since the reign of Hywel Dda.

The town is known for the ruins of Rhuddlan Castle, built by order of King Edward I from 1277 to 1282, and for the site of another castle at Twthill, built by the Norman Robert of Rhuddlan about 1072. Well-preserved Rhuddlan castle has a great round tower and many surviving walls. It was built soon after the conquest of Wales.

The town was thus where Edward I signed the Statute of Rhuddlan, laying down the way by which the Principality of Wales, created by the princes of Gwynedd, was to be governed.

The town's first Welsh chapel, now 17 Cross Street, was built in 1771.

The hymn tune "Rhuddlan" was brought to wider prominence by Ralph Vaughan Williams as music editor of the first edition of The English Hymnal in 1906, and it has since been adopted by numerous other hymnals. It is usually sung to the words of the hymns "Judge eternal, throned in splendour" and, more recently, "For the healing of the nations".

Rhuddlan railway station was part of the Vale of Clwyd Railway. The station closed in 1955 but the line remained open until 1968. The station was demolished around 1977 and a Premier Inn hotel now occupies the site.

In 2001, the A525 bypass was completed, easing access to Rhyl. Since 2001 the centre of Rhuddlan has been largely redeveloped.

=== Archaeology ===
In 2021 February, archaeologists from Aeon Archaeology announced the discovery of more than 300 stone age tools and artefacts in Rhuddlan. They revealed scrapers, microliths, flakes of chert (hard, sedimentary rock), flints and even rudimentary tools. Expert Richard Cooke believes that the remains were belong to people who was passing through and made camp by the river more than 9,000 years ago.

== Notable people ==
- Hugh of Rhuddlan an important Cambro-Norman poet writing in Old French at the end of the 12th century.
- Philip Jones Griffiths (1936–2008), photographer particularly of the Vietnam War, and a member of Magnum Photos.
- Lisa Scott-Lee (born 1975) of the pop band Steps and her brother Andy Scott-Lee (born 1980) lived in Rhuddlan.
- Peter Smith (born 1978) footballer with 180 club caps
- David Vaughan (born 1983) footballer with 476 club caps and 42 for Wales
- Kelly Lee Owens (born 1988), electronic musician and producer; grew up in a nearby village.
- Jack Sargeant (born 1994) politician, and a Member of the Senedd (MS).
