= Henry FitzRoy (died 1157) =

Illegitimate son of Henry I of England

- Born: c. 1100–1104
- Died: 1157; Anglesey, Wales
- Issue: Meiler Fitzhenry; Robert FitzHenry; Amabilis FitzHenry
- Father: Henry I of England
- Mother: Nest ferch Rhys

Henry FitzRoy (born c. 1100–1104, died 1157) was an illegitimate son of Henry I of England, possibly by Princess Nest, daughter of Rhys ap Tewdwr, last king of Deheubarth (d. 1093), and his wife, Gwladys ferch Rhiwallon ap Cynfyn, and was a grandson of William the Conqueror. He was Lord of Narberth Castle from around 1140 to his death, although it was part of the wider estates of Gilbert de Clare, Earl of Pembroke.

Henry FitzRoy held lands from his royal father in Narberth and Pebidiog. Upon his death in battle against the Welsh Prince in 1157, his lands passed to his oldest son, Meilyr, later Lord Chief Justice of Ireland for his cousin, King Henry II. Amabilis, daughter of Henry FitzRoy, married Walter de Riddlesford. Her husband Walter, along with Amabilis's uncles, her nephews and the Geralds were active in Irish affairs as well as holding large grants of land there.

In 1157 Henry FitzRoy led a naval expedition in an attempt to 'assault' the Welsh under Owain Gwynedd, King of Gwynedd 'on both land and sea', on behalf of his Norman nephew, King Henry II. When FitzRoy's army landed at Ynys Môn, he torched the churches of Llanbedrgoch and Llanfair Mathafarn Eithaf. During Owain's men gathered together and the next morning fought and defeated the Norman army and killed Henry FitzRoy by a "shower of lances".

== See also ==
- Battle of Ewloe, 1157
