= Coleshill, Flintshire =

Former division of Flintshire, Wales

Coleshill was a historic administrative division of Flintshire, Wales.

It was recorded in the Domesday Book as the vill of "Coleselt" and as "Coleshull" by Gerald of Wales. The name is of Old English origin, with the first element probably being the personal name Col.

The vill boundaries were perpetuated as those of Coleshill Fawr and Coleshill Fechan townships, which lay in Holywell parish north-west of the borough of Flint; Coleshill also subsequently gave its name to a commote, and later a hundred, of Flintshire. A Welsh form of the name, Cwnsyllt, was sometimes used. The townships of Coleshill Fawr and Coleshill Fechan were eventually merged into the Borough of Flint in 1934.

Coleshill is well known as the site of the 1157 Battle of Coleshill, otherwise known (following Gerald of Wales) as Coleshill Wood or as the Battle of Ewloe, in which an army of Henry II clashed with the forces of Owain Gwynedd. It was also supposedly the site of a battle in 1150 between Owain Gwynedd and Madog ap Maredudd of Powys, in which the latter was defeated.

In more recent times the name was remembered in that of Coleshill Farm, Flint and is now used for one of the town's electoral wards.
