= Rhuddlan Castle =

Norman castle in Denbighshire, Wales

- Castell Rhuddlan (Welsh) (Note: Since 2024, Cadw, who manage the site, use the Welsh name only.)
- Rhuddlan, Denbighshire, Wales
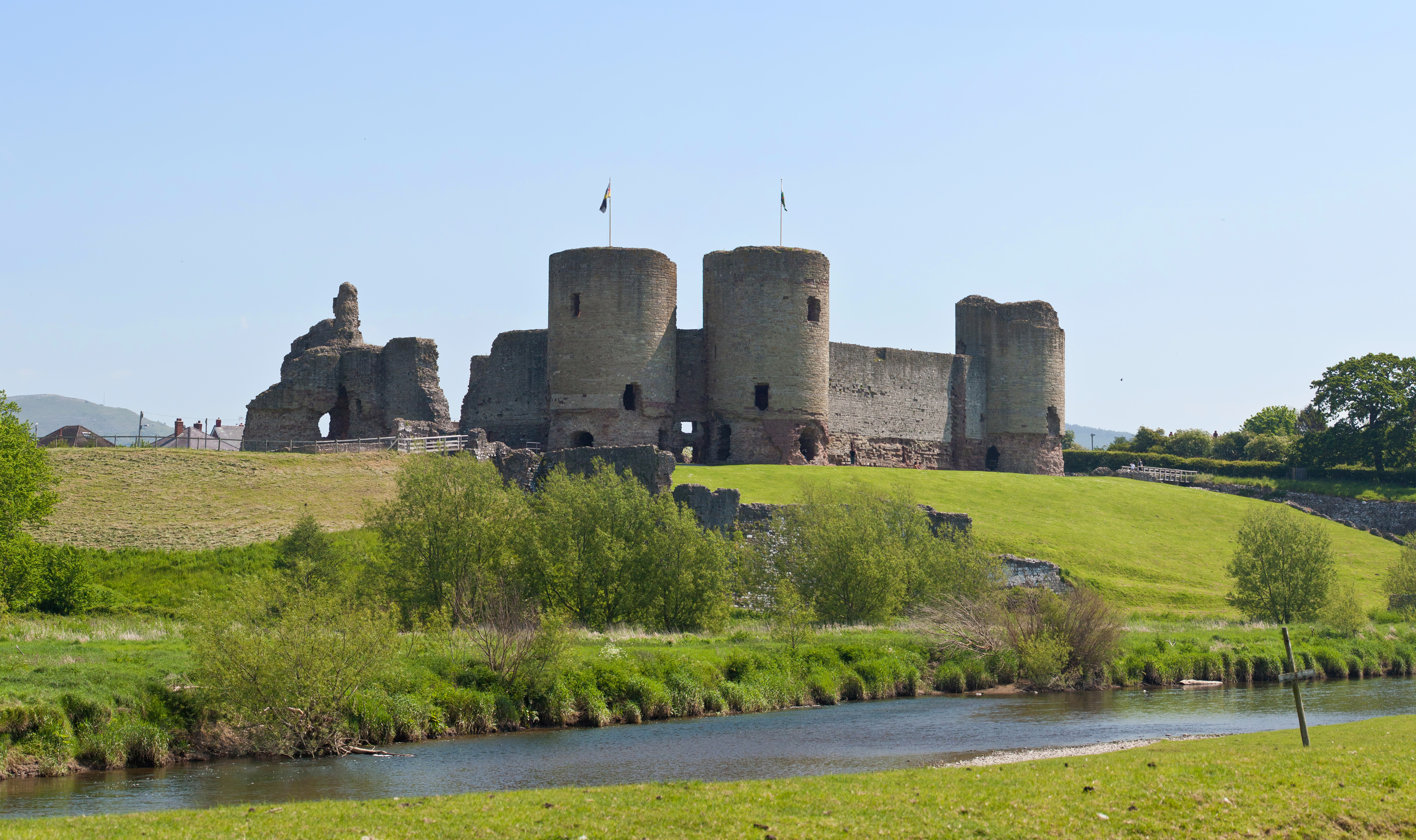
- Seen from the west, across the River Clwyd, in 2012

Site information
- Type: Concentric castle
- Controlled by: Cadw
- Condition: Ruin
- Website: Castell Rhuddlan (Cadw)

Location
- Location in Wales
- Coordinates: 53.2889°N 3.464528°W

Site history
- Built: From 1277 to 1282
- Built by: Master Bertram; James of St. George
- In use: Open to public.
- Materials: Limestone
- Demolished: 1648
- Events: Welsh Wars; English Civil War

Listed Building – Grade I

Rhuddlan Castle (Welsh: Castell Rhuddlan; Welsh pronunciation: [kastɛɬ ˈr̥ɨðlan]) is a castle located in Rhuddlan, Denbighshire, Wales. It was chosen as the location of a castle by Edward I in 1277.

Much of the work was overseen by master mason James of Saint George. Rhuddlan, which was not completed until 1282, was built concurrently with Flint Castle, at a time when King Edward I of England was consolidating his conquest of Wales. It was temporarily his residence, and his daughter, Elizabeth, is presumed to have been born there. It is currently owned by Cadw, a division of the Welsh Government.

== Construction ==
Rhuddlan was planned as a concentric castle. It has a unique 'diamond' in layout as the gatehouses are positioned at the corners of the square baileys instead of along the sides like at Flint, Harlech or Beaumaris. Records of construction costs show that it was the major piece of building work being carried out by the English during the late 1270s.

The inner ward has defensive walls with twin-tower gatehouses. The outer ward is surrounded by a curtain wall that has small towers and turrets. According to Thomas Pennant, who passed through the town on his travels in the 18th century, one of the towers is named "Twr-y-Silod" ("Grain Tower"), and another "Twr-y-Brenin" ("The King's Tower"). The castle had a three-sided moat, with the River Clwyd protecting its fourth side. Within the inner ward there was a great hall, kitchens, private apartments and a chapel. The outer bailey had a granary, stables and a smithy.

Rhuddlan is next to the River Clwyd. During the fortification's lengthy construction, the river course was straightened and dredged to allow ships to sail inland along a man-made channel. Its purpose was to allow provisions and troops to reach the castle even if hostile forces or a siege prevented overland travel.

A further protective earthwork and timber structure was created around it in 1280–82. The castle was completed prior to the rebellion of Llywelyn the Last in 1282.

== History ==
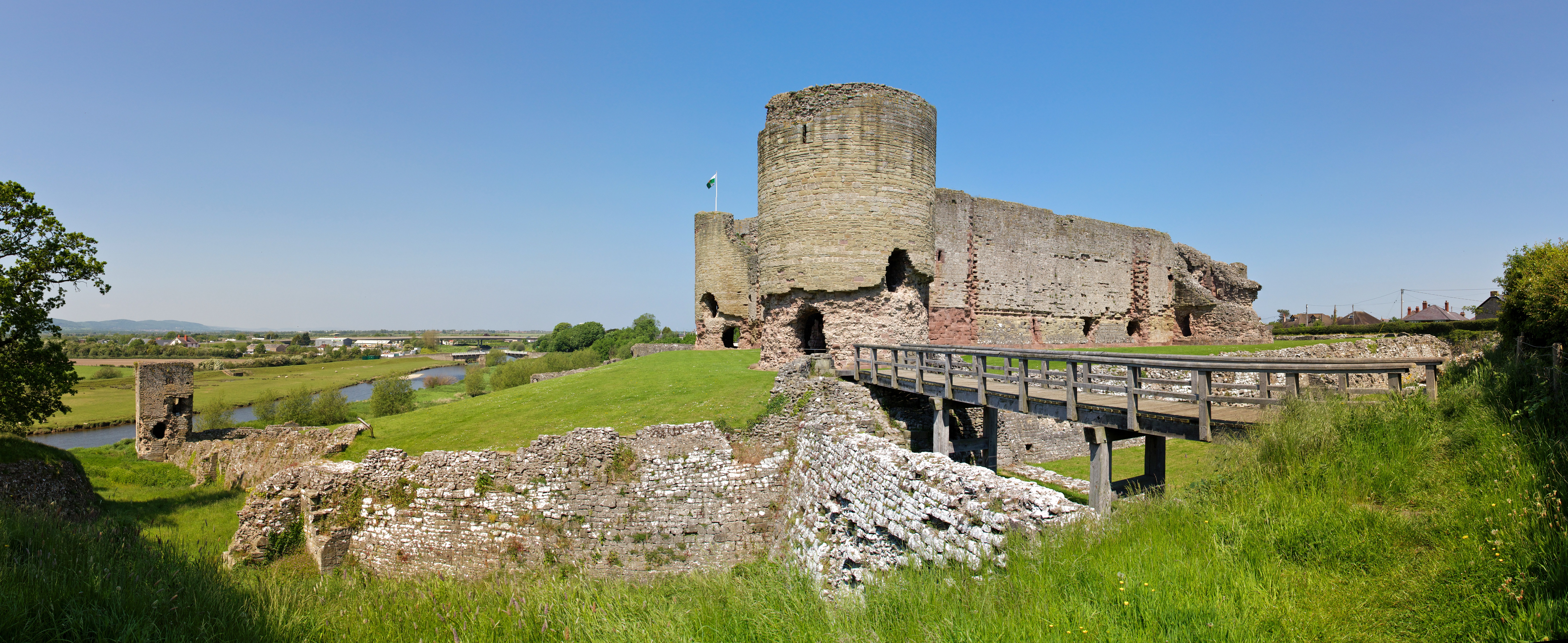
One of the two gatehouses to the inner ward, with the walls of the outer ward running off to the left, pictured in 2012

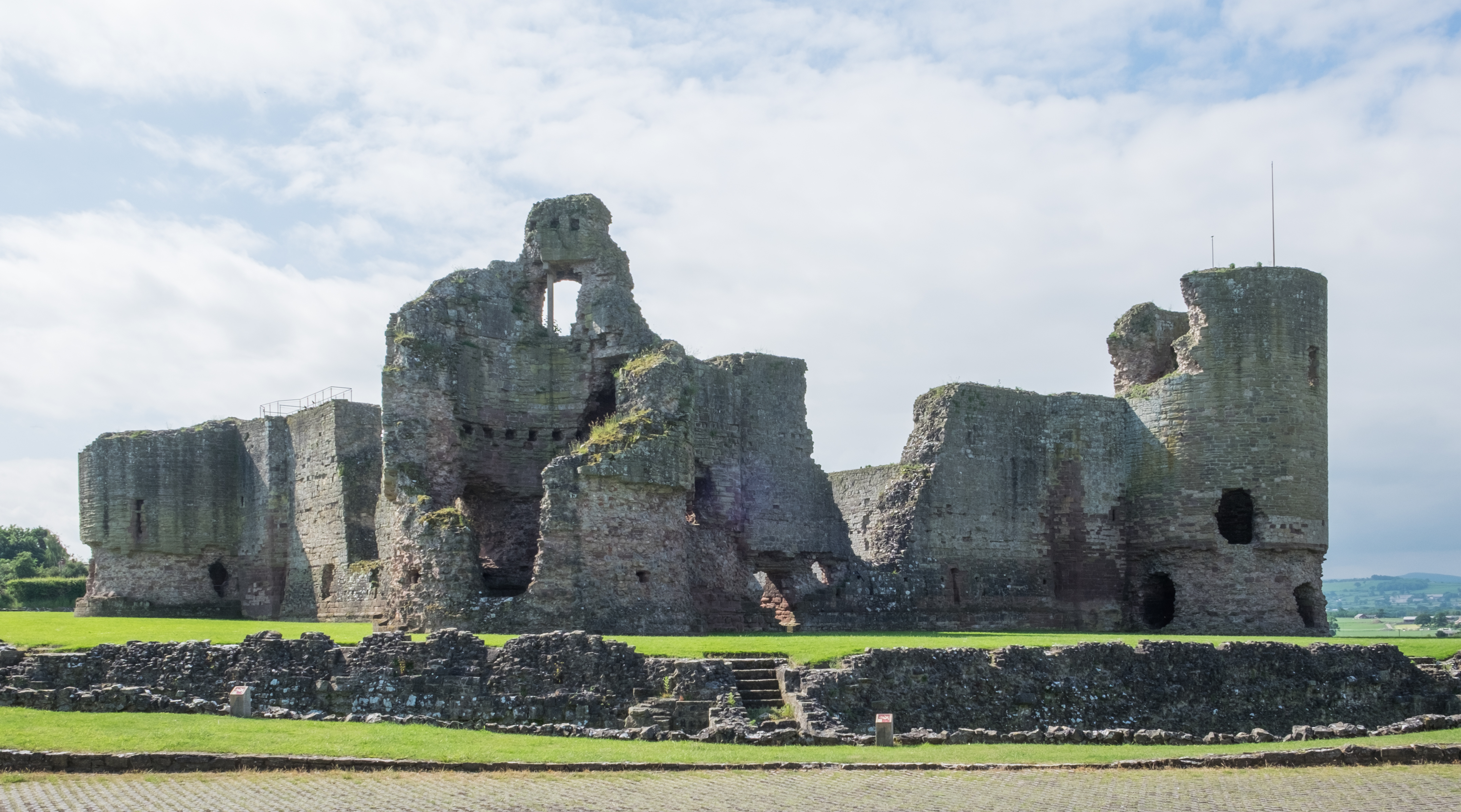
The castle from the north, showing signs of slighting (partial demolition) in 2018

The story of Rhuddlan goes back much further than the fortress built by Edward I. Prior to the Norman occupation of lower Gwynedd, Rhuddlan was at the heart of a Welsh cantref. From here the Lords of Rhuddlan commanded the Perfeddwlad (lands of north-east Wales) on behalf of Gruffydd ap Llywelyn (1007 – 5 August 1063), the last ruler of all Wales. The town itself, however, began as a Saxon "burgh" founded by Edward the Elder.

In the late 11th century, the Normans invaded Gwynedd. Rhuddlan's strategic position ensured that it was fought over by the Princes of Gwynedd and the Earls of Chester, with Gruffydd ap Llywelyn, who had been driven out by Harold Godwinson, re-taking the town. The remains of a Norman castle at Twthill, built in 1086, is just to the south of the current castle; it was built by Robert of Rhuddlan, a supporter of King William I of England.

In July 1277, at the outbreak of the Welsh Wars, Edward I left Chester and established an advance base at Flint, where building work immediately began on Flint Castle. With naval assistance from 25 ships of the Cinque Ports fleet, the army pushed along the coast. By August Edward had moved his forces on to Rhuddlan, which, as was his custom, he was able to supply by river. Three months later the town was ceded to the English Crown following the Treaty of Aberconwy between Llywelyn ap Gruffudd and Edward I.

Work on Rhuddlan Castle began immediately under the control of Master Bertram, a Gascon engineer, but construction was soon handed over to Savoyard master mason, James of St George, who remained in charge until labour ceased in 1282. Besieged by the Welsh during the rebellion of 1282, until relieved by an English force led by future Amadeus V, Count of Savoy.

Edward I also created a new borough, north of his castle, away from the pre-existing Norman town and Dominican Friary. The 13th-century street layout can still be seen in the modern town. The borough, like at Flint, was defended with a pair of ditch-separated earthworks and a timber palisade. Rhuddlan Castle became a part of Edward's Ring of Iron fortifications.

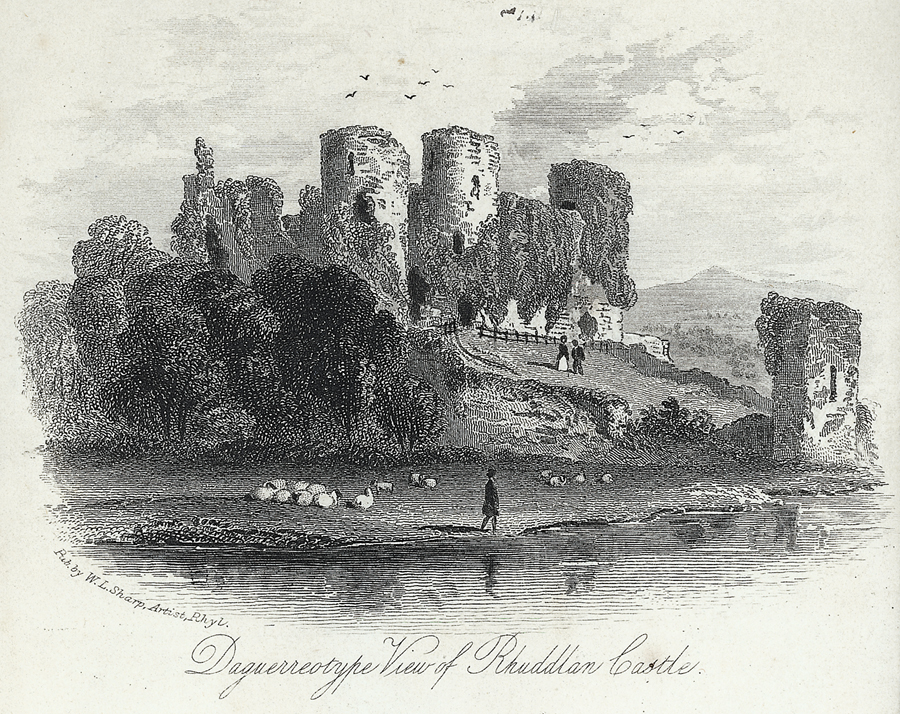
The overgrown ruins of Rhuddlan Castle in the mid-19th century

Elizabeth, the eighth daughter of Edward I, was born at Rhuddlan in 1282, the same year work at the castle was completed. Two years later the Statute of Rhuddlan was signed at the castle following the defeat of Llewellyn the Last, who had attacked the castle unsuccessfully. It ceded all the lands of the former Welsh Princes to the English Crown and introduced English common law. Edward I could now appoint Royal officials such as sheriffs, constables and bailiffs to collect taxes and enforce English law throughout Wales. Following Rhuddlan, the counties of north western North Wales were placed under the control of the Justiciar of North Wales. Although the statute brought in English legislation, Welsh law continued to be practised at local level after the conquest of the Wales. This remained the case until 1536 when Rhuddlan's statute was repealed by the Laws in Wales Acts 1535 and 1542 that made English common law the exclusive judicial system in Wales.

In 1294 the castle was attacked during the Welsh rising of Madog ap Llywelyn but was not taken. It remained in English hands and was one of the places where King Richard II of England stopped in 1399 on his way to Flint, where he would be taken prisoner by his rival, Henry IV. It was attacked again in the following year by forces of Owain Glyndŵr in 1400. This time the town was badly damaged but the castle held out. In the latter 15th and early 16th centuries the castle's condition deteriorated as its strategic and administrative importance waned.

Rhuddlan Castle was again garrisoned by Royalist troops during the English Civil War, and remained a stronghold of King Charles I of England until well after the Battle of Naseby, being taken by Parliamentary forces under Thomas Mytton after a siege in 1646. Two years later, Parliamentarians partially demolished the castle to prevent any further military use. By the time Pennant passed through in 1781, it was largely ruined.

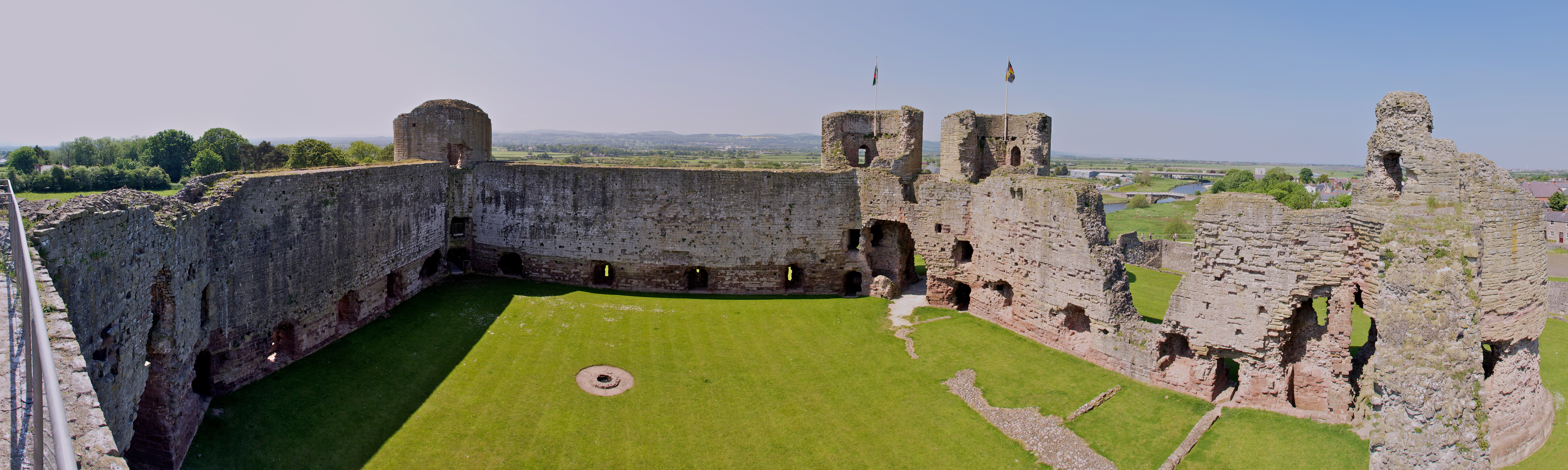
The castle's inner ward in 2012

== Present day ==
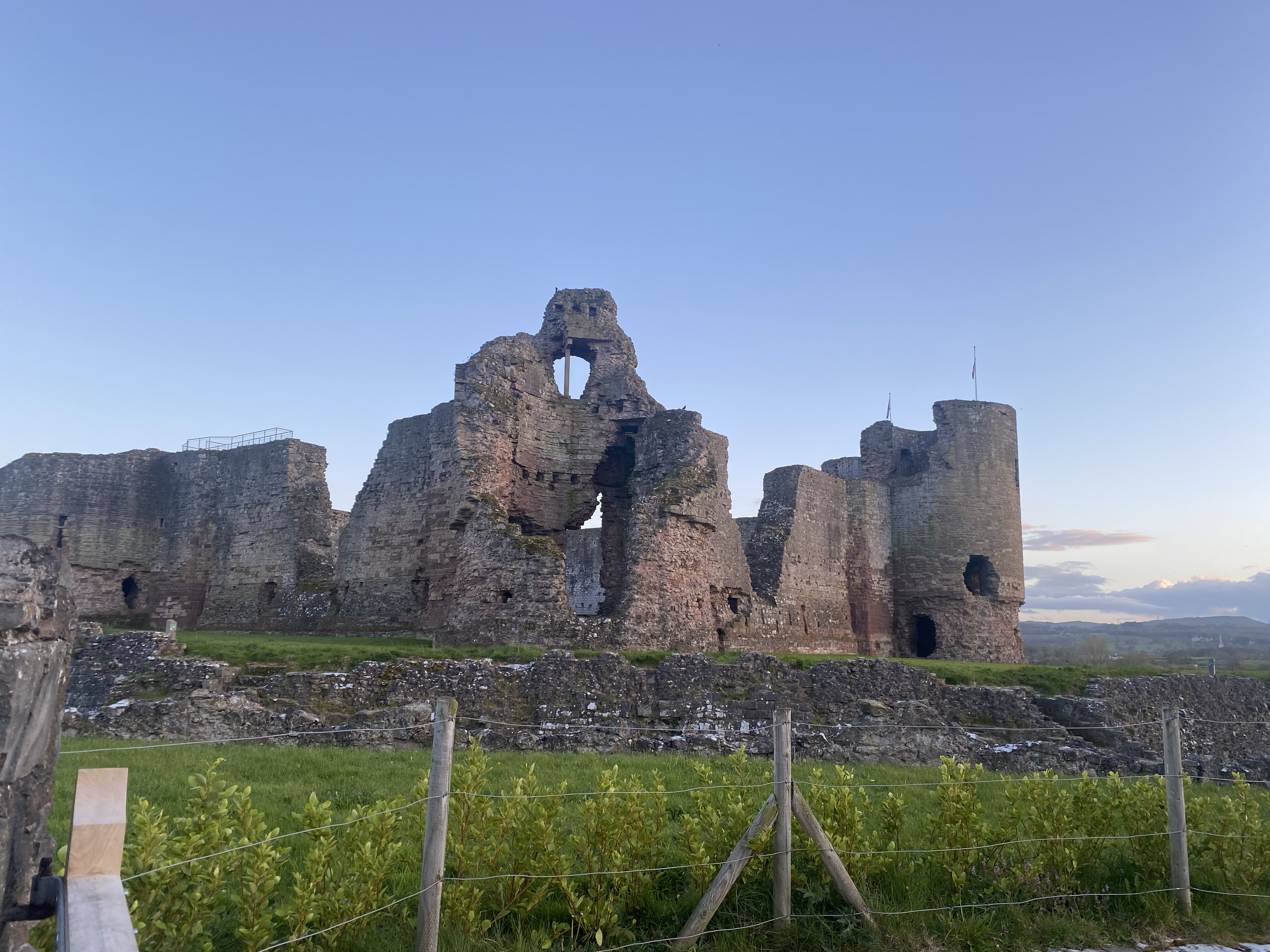
Seen from the north on Castle Street in 2026

Rhuddlan Castle is managed by Cadw, a Welsh government body with the mission to protect, conserve and promote the building heritage of Wales. Since 2024, Cadw have used the Welsh name Castell Rhuddlan in English, as part of an effort to standardise the names in both languages.

== See also ==
- Castles in Great Britain and Ireland
- List of castles in Wales
- Denbigh Castle and town walls
