= Robert of Rhuddlan =

11th-century Norman nobleman and landholder in Wales

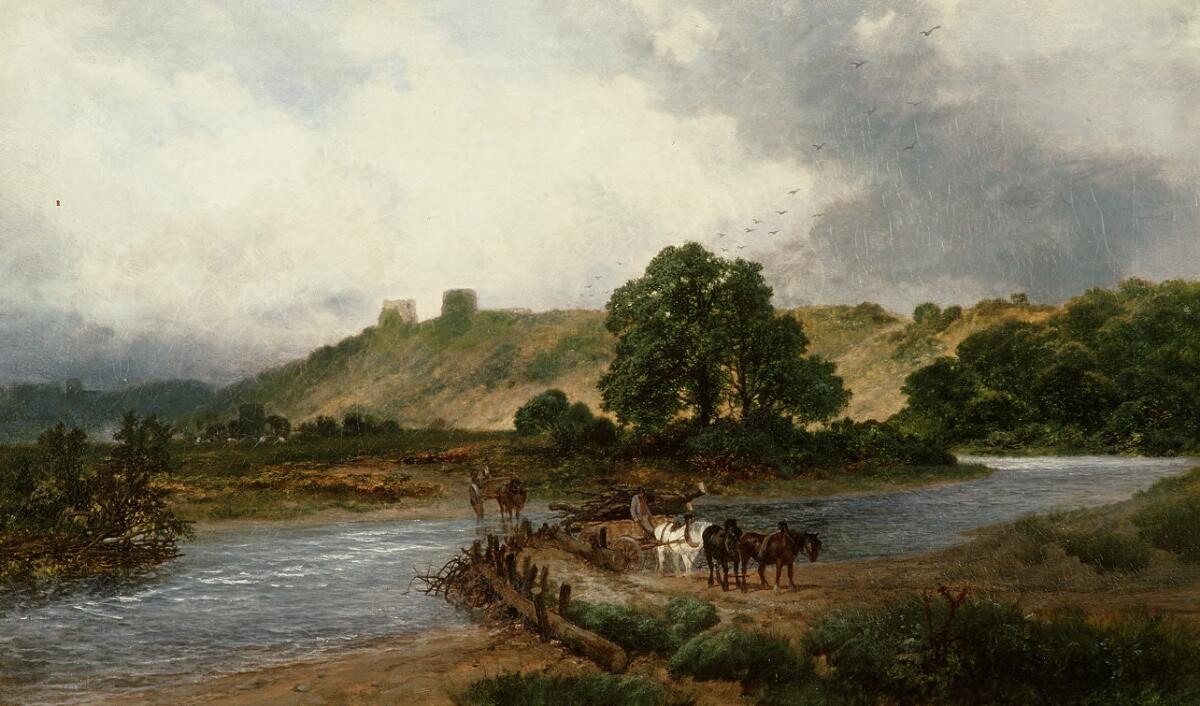
Rhuddlan, territory of Robert of Rhuddlan

Robert of Rhuddlan (died 3 July 1093) was a Norman adventurer who became lord of much of north-east Wales and for a period lord of all North Wales.

Robert was the son of Humphrey de Tillieul (or Bigod) and Adeliza de Grentemesnil, brother of Arnaud de Tilleul and the cousin of Hugh d'Avranches, the 1st Earl of Chester. He was also the father of William of Rhuddlan who was lost in the White Ship disaster in 1120.

Robert was recorded to have served as a squire in the court of Edward the Confessor and appears to have come to the Welsh Marches before 1066 in the service of the king. Hugh became Earl of Chester in 1070, and Robert appears to have been appointed Hugh's "commander of troops" in 1072. He immediately began hostilities with the Welsh, and having captured land in the cantref of Tegeingl (North East Wales) he built a Motte-and-bailey castle at Twthill near Rhuddlan, holding the lands as a vassal of Earl Hugh.

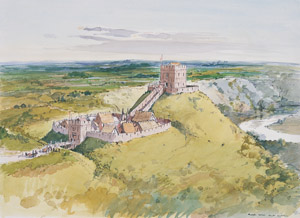
Twthill, reconstruction of Old Rhuddlan Castle

When Gruffudd ap Cynan tried to recover the throne of Gwynedd from Trahaearn ap Caradog in 1075, Robert assisted Gruffudd by providing Norman troops. Later the same year Trahaearn counter-attacked and drove Gruffudd to seek refuge in Ireland, but Robert was able to take advantage of the civil war to seize the cantrefs of Rhos and Rhufoniog and to build another castle at Deganwy. He now ruled most of northern Wales east of the River Conwy.

In 1081, Trahaearn ap Caradog, who had been able to prevent Robert from encroaching further west, was killed in the Battle of Mynydd Carn by Gruffudd ap Cynan and his allies. Gruffudd now became king of Gwynedd, but shortly thereafter he was captured by treachery by the Normans at Rhug near Corwen. Gruffudd was imprisoned by Earl Hugh in his castle at Chester, but Robert seems to have been responsible for his capture, since he was the one to claim Gruffydd's lands. Robert built castles at Bangor, Caernarfon, Aberlleiniog and elsewhere. In the Domesday Book he is said to hold all of North Wales apart from lands belonging to the bishoprics of Bangor and St Asaph, holding these lands directly of the king and not as in fief from Earl Hugh. He was liable to an annual rent of £40.

On William the Conqueror's death in 1087, war broke out between his sons. Robert supported the elder son, Robert Curthose and in 1088 he and his troops were involved in the siege of Rochester. They were however obliged to surrender to the forces of William Rufus.

Robert was killed on 3 July 1093; according to chronicler Orderic Vitalis there was a skirmish with a force led by Gruffudd ap Cynan which resulted in Robert's death. He was enjoying a noontide nap in his castle at Deganwy when the news was brought to him that Welsh raiders had landed in three ships underneath the Great Orme and pillaged his lands. Some sources say that these raiders were led by Gruffudd ap Cynan, who had escaped from captivity in Chester. The raiders had beached their ships and were busy loading the plunder. Robert despatched messengers to gather his troops and hastened to the Great Orme, where he found that the rising tide was about to allow the Welsh to refloat their vessels and get away with the loot before Robert's troops could appear. In a fury, Robert rushed down the slopes to attack them, followed only by his armour-bearer. He was killed by a volley of javelins, and the raiders sailed off with his head attached to the mast of one of the vessels.

Robert's lands in Gwynedd were now taken over by Earl Hugh of Chester, but the Welsh revolt of 1094 led by Gruffudd ap Cynan resulted in the loss of most of this territory.

== Bibliography ==
- Arthur Jones (1910). The history of Gruffydd ap Cynan: the Welsh text with translation, introduction and notes. Manchester University Press.
- John Edward Lloyd (1911). A history of Wales: from the earliest times to the Edwardian conquest. Longmans, Green & Co.
