= Builth Castle =

Castle built under King Edward I, just outside Builth Wells, Powys, Wales

Coordinates: 52.14919°N 3.39855°W

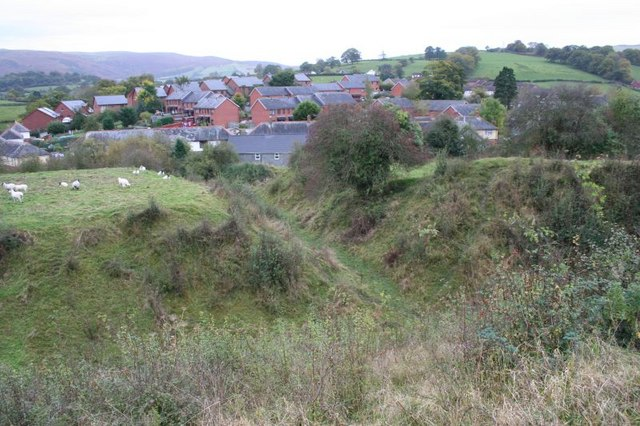
Builth Castle

Builth Castle (Welsh: Castell Llanfair-ym-Muallt) was a castle built under King Edward I, just outside Builth Wells, Powys, Wales. At one time it was an impressive stone-built castle but all the masonry has been removed over the years and all that remains are the mound on which it stood, the ditches and embankments.

== History ==
Builth Castle was erected in 1277, the first castle to be built by King Edward I in Wales. The site chosen was a pre-existing motte-and-bailey castle with a motte surrounded by two baileys, all surrounded by a further boundary wall. This older castle had already changed hands several times as the Normans and Welsh fought for supremacy in these parts, and the small town of Builth had sprung up nearby. In 1260 the old castle was taken and largely destroyed by Llywelyn ap Gruffudd. It is not clear how much of the original structure was still there when Edward I started building his stone castle. Construction started in May 1277, and continued until August 1282, when the castle was left unfinished for lack of money. This was probably because Llywelyn ap Gruffudd had been killed and Edward had changed his priorities because he wanted to concentrate on his invasion of Gwynedd. As at Flint Castle begun at the same time, construction began with an enclosure of the site by a wooden palisade, in the case of Builth of some 270 yards in length. Records show that the total cost of the castle was £1,666, a comparatively modest sum because the earthworks were already present on the site.

The castle was besieged in 1294 during the revolt of Madog ap Llywelyn. On 7 February 1301, Edward I gave Builth Castle to his son, Edward. Between 1310 and 1315, a local magnate - Roger Mortimer - served Edward as castellan of Builth. When the latter Edward succeeded his father as king, he gifted the Castle to his wife, Isabella; in turn, with Edward's consent, Isabella rented the castle back to Roger Mortimer, for 170 marks per half-year (due at Michaelmas and Easter). Mortimer, a man with an increasingly powerful hold over Isabella (who eventually became his lover), subsequently obtained an agreement that the castle would become his outright when Isabella died.

Isabella and Mortimer executed a coup against Edward, eventually resulting in Edward's ignominious death. In 1330, when Edward's son (Edward III) reached adulthood, he was able to arrange for Mortimer and Isabella to be captured, and have Mortimer executed for treason. On the king's orders, Mortimer's property was seized by relevant officials - Buellt was taken by Gilbert Talbot, 1st Baron Talbot, the Justiciar of South Wales. Edward had been assisted, in his counter-coup against Mortimer, by the prominent noblewoman Alice de Lacy, and her second husband Eubulus le Strange; in reward, Edward granted them Builth Castle for life. Following Eubulus' death in 1335, and Alice's subsequent re-marriage, her new husband / rapist - Hugh de Freyne - was acknowledged by the King as lord of Builth. Alice died childless in 1348.

King Edward granted Builth to his son, the Black Prince. In 1359, the Prince re-established the rental arrangement (still at 170 marks per half-year) with the Mortimer family, retaining the right to garrison the castle in times of war. When it was attacked by Owain Glyndŵr's forces, during his revolt in the early 15th century, the garrison was under the command of Sir John Oldcastle (Shakespeare's Falstaff). It was repaired in 1409, the bill being £400.

The rental arrangement was terminated during the War of the Roses, when Richard of York, heir of the Mortimer family, claimed the crown (as heir of Philippa of Clarence); the hostilities ended when Richard's heir, Elizabeth of York, married the man who became King Henry VII. In November 1493, Buellt (including Builth Castle) was re-established as a Marcher Lordship, for their son, Arthur. Arthur, however, died in 1502, childless. During the reign of Arthur's younger brother, King Henry VIII, the castle burnt down, and over subsequent years the ruins were gradually raided by the local population to provide building material for their properties.

Nowadays, only the impressive mound, embankments and ditches remain but all the stonework has vanished (removed by the local populace to build their dwellings).

== See also ==
- Ring of Iron
- Castles in Great Britain and Ireland
- List of castles in Wales
