= Wellington Declaration =

The "Wellington Declaration" (otherwise known as the Declaration of Wellington) was a manifesto by King Charles I near the start of the English Civil War.

On 18 September 1642, before the first major pitched battle of Civil War, King Charles I raised his standard "in the vicinity of" (i.e. not actually in) Wellington, at the time a small, though highly influential, market town in Shropshire and addressed his troops the next day. He declared that he would uphold "the Protestant Religion, the Laws of England, and the Liberty of Parliament".

The Wellington Declaration was held to be so important that the Royal Mint stamped its slogans on the reverse of the 10/- silver coins RELIG:PROT:LEG:ANG:LIBER:PAR and silver half crowns (2/6) REL.PRO.LEG.ANG.LIB.PAR that it produced at that time. The inscriptions abbreviate the words "RELIGIO PROTESTANTIUM, LEGES ANGLIAE, LIBERTAS PARLIAMENTI", which is the declaration in Latin.
