= Tywysog =

Welsh word meaning "prince"

Tywysog (Welsh pronunciation: [təˈwəsɔɡ]), in modern Welsh, means "Prince", but historically it referred to a broader category of rulers.

The feminine form (Princess) is Tywysoges.

The work Brut y Tywysogion is the Annals of the Princes of Wales and is a historical narrative of the deeds of the various rulers of the kingdoms, large and small, which existed in Wales from the end of Roman rule in Britain in c.410AD to the final conquest of Wales and the death of its last consecrated native Tywysog Llywelyn ap Gruffudd of Gwynedd in 1282, who was also the first to bear the title Tywysog Cymru (Prince of Wales). Owain Glyndŵr, Lord of Glyndyfrdwy, and claimed heir to the Kingdom of Powys, was also proclaimed Tywysog Cymru in 1400, but his rule had come to an end by 1412.

Tywysog is cognate with taoiseach in Irish and tòiseach in Scottish Gaelic; the latter forms an element in "MacIntosh" (Mac an Tòisich) (see Clan Mackintosh). Both words originally had a similar meaning in the Goidelic languages to tywysog, with taoiseach coming to mean the Irish head of government, and tòiseach a Scottish clan chief.

The word tywysog itself derives from Welsh tywys "to lead", so the literal meaning of tywysog is "one who leads".

In modern Welsh, the word tywysog can be used to refer to any prince.
