= Hywel ap Rhys =

Hywel ap Rhys ('Howell son of Reese') is a Welsh name that may refer to:

- Hywel ap Rhys (Glywysing), king of part or all of Glywysing (r. c. 840–886)
- Hywel ap Rhys (died 1231), later known as Hywel Sais ('Hywel the Saxon'), son of Rhys ap Gruffydd
- Hywel ap Rhys Gryg (fl. 1220s), son of Rhys Gryg (son of Rhys ap Gruffydd)
