= Rhys Gryg =

Welsh prince (died 1234)

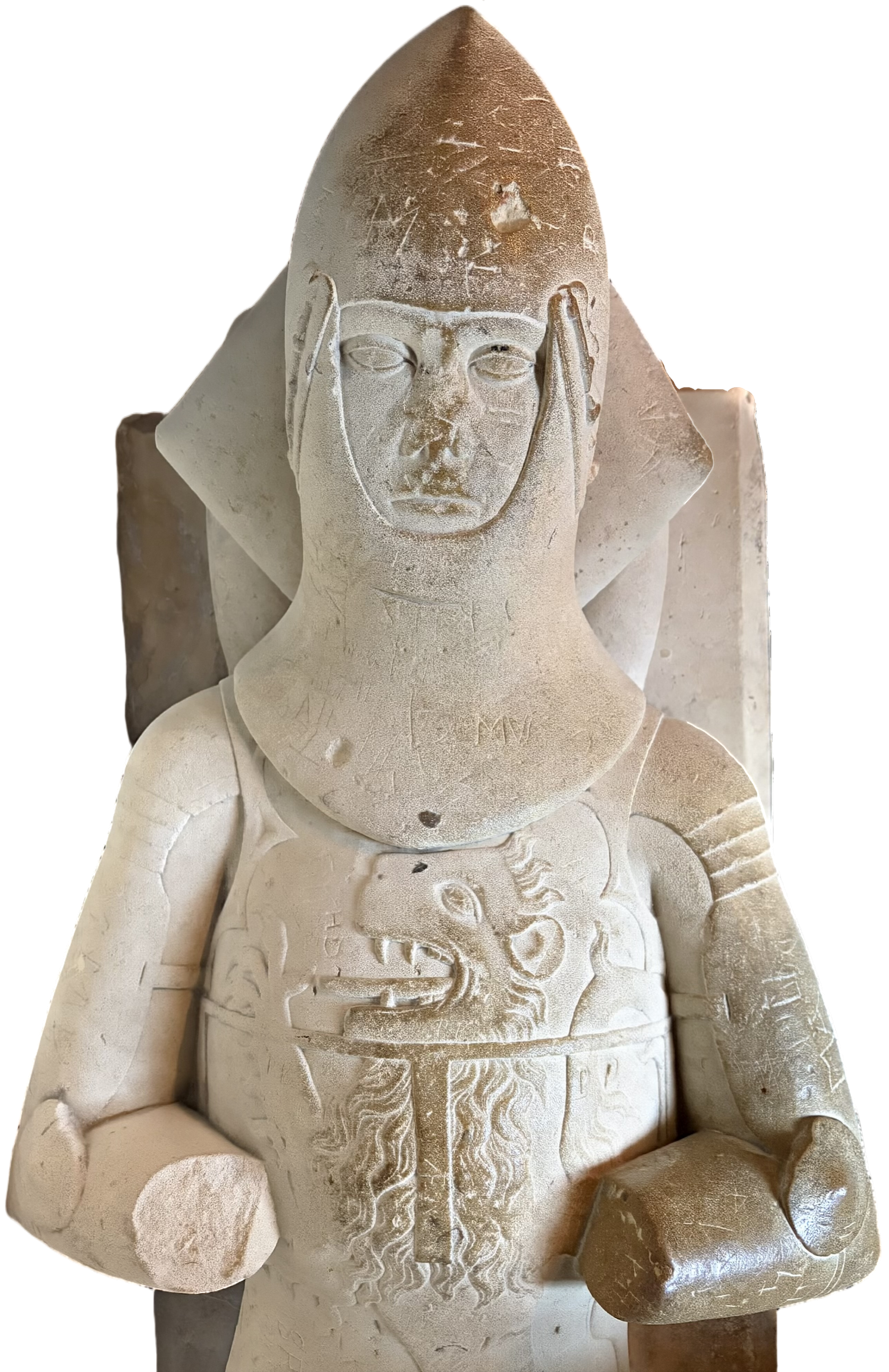
- Fourteenth-century effigy identified as Rhys Gryg in St Davids
- Died: 1234
- Noble family: Cadelling
- Spouse: Matilda de Clare
- Father: Rhys ap Gruffudd
- Mother: Gwenllian ferch Madog

Rhys Gryg ('Rhys the Hoarse'; died 1234), real name Rhys ap Rhys, also known as Rhys Fychan ('Rhys the Younger'), was a Welsh prince who ruled part of the Kingdom of Deheubarth.

== Lineage ==
Rhys was the fourth son of Rhys ap Gruffudd (the Lord Rhys) and his wife Gwenllian, daughter of Madog ap Maredudd of Powys.

== Family feud ==
He married Mathilde, the daughter of Richard de Clare, 3rd Earl of Hertford and Marcher Lord of Cardigan. Her brother-in-law was Richard of Cornwall, King of the Romans.

In Rhys ap Gruffudd's old age he had a great deal of trouble keeping control of his sons, and a bitter feud broke out between Gruffudd ap Rhys II and Maelgwn ap Rhys. Rhys Gryg formed an alliance with Gruffudd against Maelgwn, then in 1195 joined with another brother, Maredudd, in a conspiracy against their father and captured Dinefwr Castle. Their father, however, retaliated by capturing both of them and imprisoning them in Ystrad Meurig Castle.

== Power play ==
Rhys ap Gruffudd died in 1197, and Rhys Gryg's ally Gruffudd in 1201, and by 1204 Maelgwn had taken possession of most of Deheubarth. In 1204, Rhys made an alliance with Gruffudd's sons, Rhys and Owain, and drove Maelgwn out of Ystrad Tywi which was then shared between them, with Rhys Gryg getting Cantref Mawr. By 1211 Rhys had fallen out with his nephews, who were supporters of Llywelyn ab Iorwerth, and intervened on behalf of King John of England, attacking and capturing Llandovery from them with the help of English royal troops.

After John forced Llywelyn to give up all his conquests outside the core area of Gwynedd, Rhys joined with Maelgwn to eject his nephews from the remainder of their lands. However, when King John built a castle at Aberystwyth, Rhys and Maelgwn changed sides, attacked the castle and burnt it. In 1212, Rhys attacked and burnt Swansea.

== Defeat, flight and capture ==
The sons of Gruffudd ap Rhys, Rhys and Owain, had now made their peace with King John and sided with the English king. In 1213 an English army led by Falkes de Bréauté was sent to strip Rhys Gryg of his lands and give them to his nephews. Rhys was defeated in a battle at Llandeilo and was forced to flee to Ceredigion to seek the protection of his brother Maelgwn. Later in the year he was captured by the English and imprisoned at Carmarthen.

== Release and revolt ==
In 1215, however, the sons of Gruffudd ap Rhys turned against the King and made an alliance with their uncle Maelgwn. The English released Rhys Gryg in the hope that he would start a civil war, but instead Rhys joined forces with Llywelyn ab Iorwerth and he, along with Maelgwn and the sons of Gruffudd ap Rhys, was with Llywelyn in the attack which captured many castles in South Wales in December of that year. At the parliament held by Llywelyn at Aberdyfi in 1216, Rhys Gryg was allocated Cantref Mawr and Cantref Bychan and other lands.

== Death ==
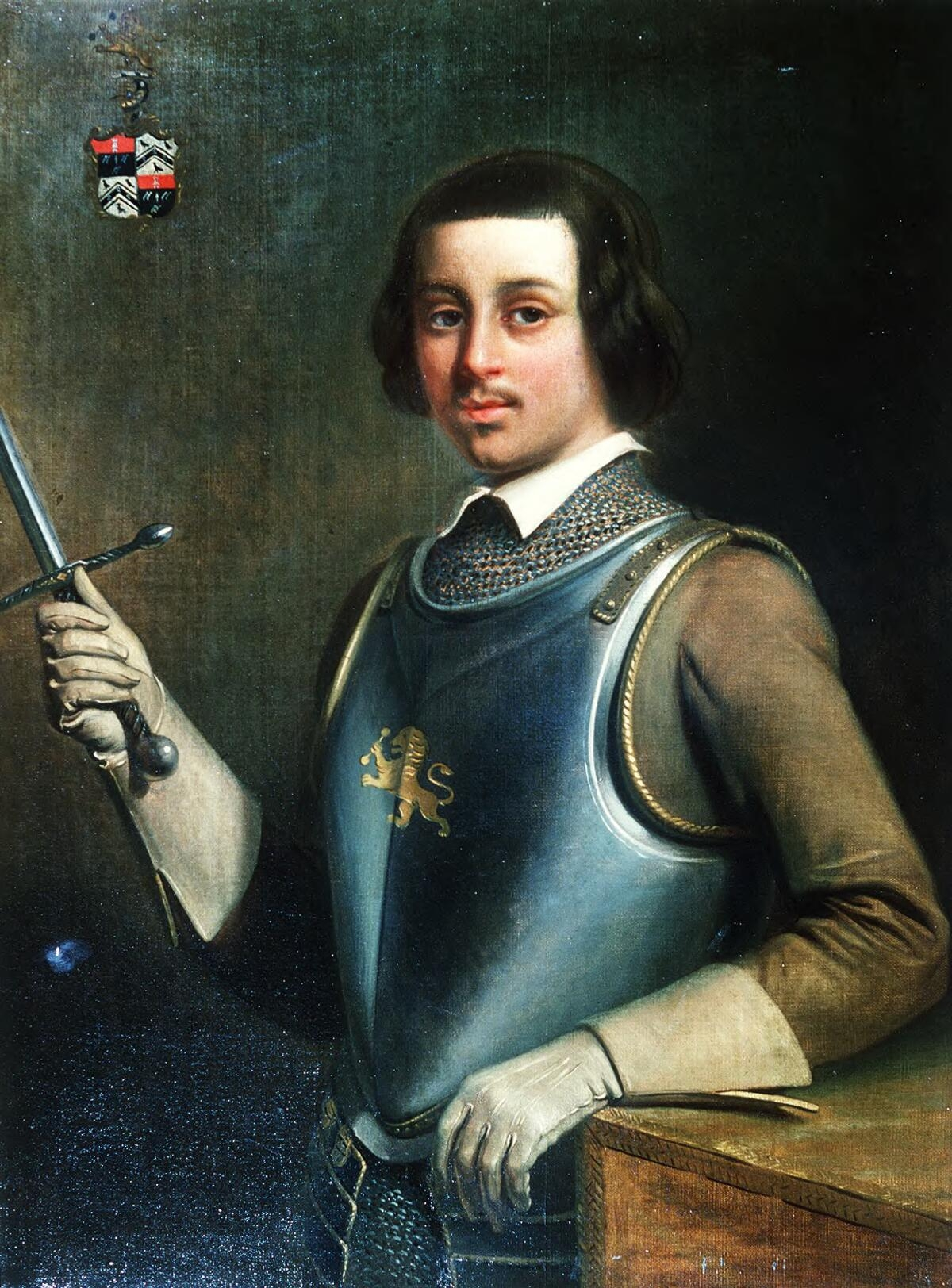
19th-century imaginary portrait of Rhys Gryg by Jean Pierre Victor Dartiguenave

Rhys supported Llywelyn during the remainder of his career. In the war of 1231 he joined with his brother Maelgwn's son, Maelgwn Fychan, to burn Cardigan and then capture the castle for Llywelyn. In 1234 he joined with Maelgwn Fychan again to attack Carmarthen, but received wounds of which he died at Llandeilo Fawr shortly thereafter.

He was buried in St Davids Cathedral and was succeeded by his son Maredudd. He left another son known as Rhys Mechyll (d. 1244), who had a son named Rhys Fychan ap Rhys Mechyll and a daughter named Gwenllian, who being assumed as an heiress and married Gilbert Talbot (d. 1274), grandfather of Gilbert Talbot, 1st Baron Talbot (d. 1345/6). Talbot took the ancient arms of the House of Deheubarth as "arms of alliance" on marriage to a great princess superseding his own former paternal arms of Bendy of 10 pieces argent and gules (Encyclopædia Britannica, 9th.ed. vol. 11, p. 691, Heraldry; Debrett's Peerage, 1968, p. 1015, E. of Shrewsbury & Waterford). The assumption about Gwenllian was, however, unfounded as Rhys Mechyll, Lord of Dinefwr, also had male heirs who acceded to the arms of the House of Deheubarth.

== Bibliography ==
- John Edward Lloyd (1911) A history of Wales from the earliest times to the Edwardian conquest (Longmans, Green & Co.)
- Rhys Gryg in the Dictionary of Welsh Biography
