= Puy (society) =

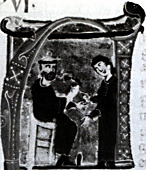
The Monge de Montaudon receives a prize for his poetry from the Puy Sainta Maria: the white sparrowhawk perched on his arm.

A puy or pui was a society, often organised as a guild or confraternity, sometimes along religious (Catholic) lines, for the patronisation of music and poetry, typically through the holding of competitions. The term puy derives from the Latin podium, meaning "a place to stand", referring probably to a raised platform from which either the contests delivered their works or the judges listened to them. Puys were established in many cities in northern and central France, the Low Countries, and even England during the High Middle Ages and the Renaissance, usually encouraging composition in the Old French language, but also in Latin and Occitan.

The typical puy was dedicated to the Virgin Mary. Membership was regulated by statutes to which those entering had to swear. These governed the election of executive positions within the puy and the benefits inhering in members. Members could be clerical or lay, male or female, noble or bourgeois, urban or rural. The earliest societies were organised around para-liturgical celebrations of the Marian feast days, but these evolved poetry competitions and eventually the competitions became the focus of the festivals. Music and sung performance were emphasised early on, but over the centuries the quality of the poetry came to dominate the members' concern and the puys of Normandy, especially popular from the fifteenth century on, were redefined in the seventeenth as literary academies. In this form they survived until the French Revolution.

A poetical society known, in a generic fashion, as the Puy Sainta Maria (Puy-Sainte-Marie), seems to have held contests at Le-Puy-en-Velay (Podium Aniciense) in the Occitan language under the patronage of Alfonso II of Aragon (1162–96). Among the troubadours known to have competed was the Monge de Montaudon, who received a Eurasian sparrowhawk as a prize for one piece. He is said by his vida to have held the "suzerainty" of the "court of Puy" (cour du Puy) until it was dissolved.

The height of the French puys was in the Late Middle Ages. The puy would have an open invitation for competitions in several categories, with the theme, form, and refrain in each category stipulated. Among the common most common forms were the formes fixes, the chant royal, jeu parti, serventois, and ballade. The music was generally strophic monophony, but the puy at Évreux, founded in 1570, did accept two submissions of through-composed polyphony from Orlande de Lassus. The problems of adjudication at the contests spurred the production of several treatises on versification in the fifteenth and sixteenth centuries. As in the Floral Games celebrated in southern France and Spain, the prizes awarded by the puys could be flowers, such as lilies or roses, or sometimes palms. These floral prizes could be redeemable for money. Besides these, the puys sometimes bestowed signet rings (engraved with imagery or poetry). The puys could attract professionals and men of fame, such as Jean Froissart, who competed and won at Abbeville, Lille, Tournai, and Valenciennes. They also attracted local amateurs.

== Known puys ==
- Confrérie de Notre-Dame du Puy d'Abbeville
- Confrérie de Notre-Dame du Puy d'Amiens
- Puy d'Arras
- Puy de Beauvais
- Puy de la Conception de Caen
- Puy de Dieppe
- Confrérie de Notre-Dame du Puy de Douai
- Puy de Sainte-Cécile d'Évreux
- Puy de Lille
- Puy of London
- Puy de Paris
- Puy de Rouen
- Puy de Tournai
- Confrérie de Notre-Dame du Puy de Valenciennes

== Legacy ==
The first documented Welsh eisteddfod was hosted by Rhys ap Gruffydd, the Prince of Deheubarth through his paternal descent from the House of Dinefwr, at Cardigan Castle on Christmas Day, 1176. According to Hywel Teifi Edwards, what few details are recorded of the event in the Brut y Tywysogion, "encourage the view that it could not have been the first of its kind."

Rhys awarded two chairs as prizes, one for the winner of the poetry competition and the other for music. The bardic chair went to a poet from Gwynedd, while the musical chair went to the son of Eilon the Crythwr, a member of Rhys's court. Armchairs were a valuable asset, normally reserved for people of high status.

In 2007, Welsh historian Roger Turvey, writing of Dinefwr Castle, suggested that The Lord Rhys' idea for a competitive festival of music and poetry at Cardigan Castle may have been inspired by similar contests in other parts of Catholic Europe. In those other countries, aspiring poets were trained through apprenticeship to master craftsmen or by attending schools run by poets' guilds such as the Puy of France, the Meistersingers of the Holy Roman Empire, or the Rederijkerskamers of the Netherlands, all of which also organized eisteddfod-like contests between poets on patronal feast days of the Roman Catholic liturgical year. The Lord Rhys, Turvey suggested, may have learned about the Puy tradition from the Cambro-Normans in the Welsh Marches or from Welsh mercenary soldiers returning from France.

When asked about Turvey's theory, recognized eisteddfod historian Hywel Teifi Edwards said, "It's conjecture, but there's no doubt that there was a bardic tradition of competition for status before this time." Edwards further stated that any foreign influence was an indication of how very cosmopolitan Medieval Wales had been. "It's a sign of a healthy culture to accept – and marry with – other cultures," he added.
