= Archbishop Baldwin's 1188 tour of Wales =

Recruitment for the Third Crusade

- Part of the Third Crusade
- Route of the tour, as described by Gerald of Wales in his Itinerarium Kambriae
- Date: March to April 1188
- Location: Wales and western England, starting and ending in Hereford
- Participants: Baldwin of Forde, Gerald of Wales, others

Archbishop Baldwin's 1188 tour of Wales was a preaching tour undertaken in March and April 1188 by Baldwin of Forde, the Archbishop of Canterbury, accompanied by Gerald of Wales and other clergy, to recruit participants for the Third Crusade.

The party began and ended its journey at Hereford in England, travelling through Wales and preaching to Welsh and Anglo-Norman audiences. Baldwin also took advantage of the tour to celebrate mass at all four Welsh cathedrals, asserting Canterbury's ecclesiastical authority.

Gerald claimed that 3,000 men took the cross, although this figure is unverifiable and far fewer ultimately departed on crusade. He subsequently recorded the journey in his Itinerarium Kambriae, which is the primary source for the tour.

== Background ==
On 4 July 1187, Saladin defeated the army of the Kingdom of Jerusalem at the Battle of Hattin and Jerusalem surrendered on 2 October. Upon hearing the news Pope Urban III died of shock, and on 29 October 1187 his successor, Pope Gregory VIII, issued the Audita tremendi, calling the Third Crusade.

On 21 January 1188, Henry II of England and Philip II of France took the cross at Gisors followed by Barbarossa, the Holy Roman Emperor, in March. On 11 February 1188, upon his return from France, Henry II summoned the prelates and magnates of England to Geddington. Archbishop Baldwin preached to the assembly, urging them to join the crusade, and the Saladin Tithe was approved.

In 1188, Wales was divided between territories ruled by native Welsh princes and those controlled by Anglo-Norman marcher lords. Henry II was recognised as overlord of Wales, and Lord Rhys, the leading Welsh prince, maintained close relations with him.

=== Sources ===
The main source for the tour is Gerald of Wales's Itinerarium Kambriae. His De rebus a se gestis, Expugnatio Hibernica, and De principis instructione also contain information about the journey. Two non-Geraldinian sources briefly mention the tour: the chronicles of Gervase of Canterbury and the Annales Cambriae. Accounts of the tour therefore rely overwhelmingly on Gerald, although Huw Pryce argues that critical analysis and consideration of the context can still yield insight.

== Purpose ==
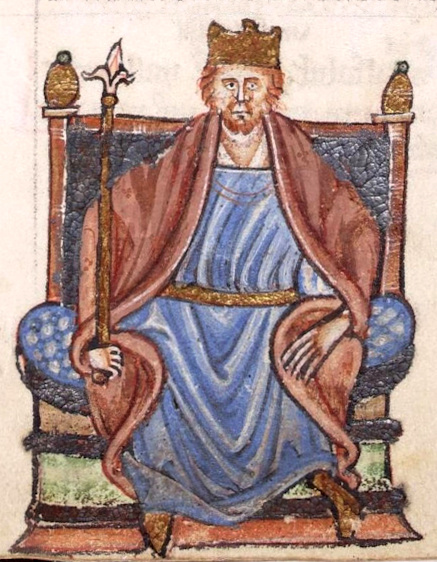
Illumination of Henry II from the Topographia Hibernica

The primary purpose of the tour was to recruit native Welshmen and Anglo-Norman settlers for the Third Crusade. Elsewhere, Henry II did not seek mass enlistment, and his primary goal was to gather funds for the expedition through the Saladin Tithe and to pay for professional soldiers.

One possible explanation for Henry's different approach in Wales is that, as its overlord rather than its direct ruler, he could not impose the Saladin Tithe. The Welsh economy may also have been too weak to pay the tithe in cash. Additionally, Henry may have been motivated by the military prowess of the Welsh, especially the southern Welsh, whose archers he had widely employed as mercenaries. His decision may have been influenced by a Welsh tradition of devotion to crusading, though there is no evidence of previous attempts to recruit crusaders in Wales. Huw Pryce suggests that the Saladin Tithe may have been partly intended to fund the upkeep of Welsh crusaders, few of whom could afford to support themselves.

Henry may have also had ulterior motives. The tour may have been intended to recruit Welsh nobles who could otherwise cause trouble at home while Henry was off fighting, and to counter Welsh opposition to Anglo-Norman advances and demonstrate English temporal and spiritual control over Wales.

Archbishop Baldwin's primary motivation was genuine piety and devotion, and he was one of only two English bishops to go on crusade. Nonetheless, he did have ulterior motives, and by celebrating mass at all four Welsh cathedrals used the tour to strengthen Canterbury's authority over the Church in Wales. Conducting these visits as part of the crusading campaign made opposition difficult, as it risked papal censure.

Gervase of Canterbury claimed that Baldwin undertook the tour to escape a dispute with the monks of Christ Church, Canterbury. Gervase was himself a monk of Christ Church and therefore had a personal interest in the dispute, but the timing of the tour was convenient and there is likely some truth to his claim.

== Tour ==
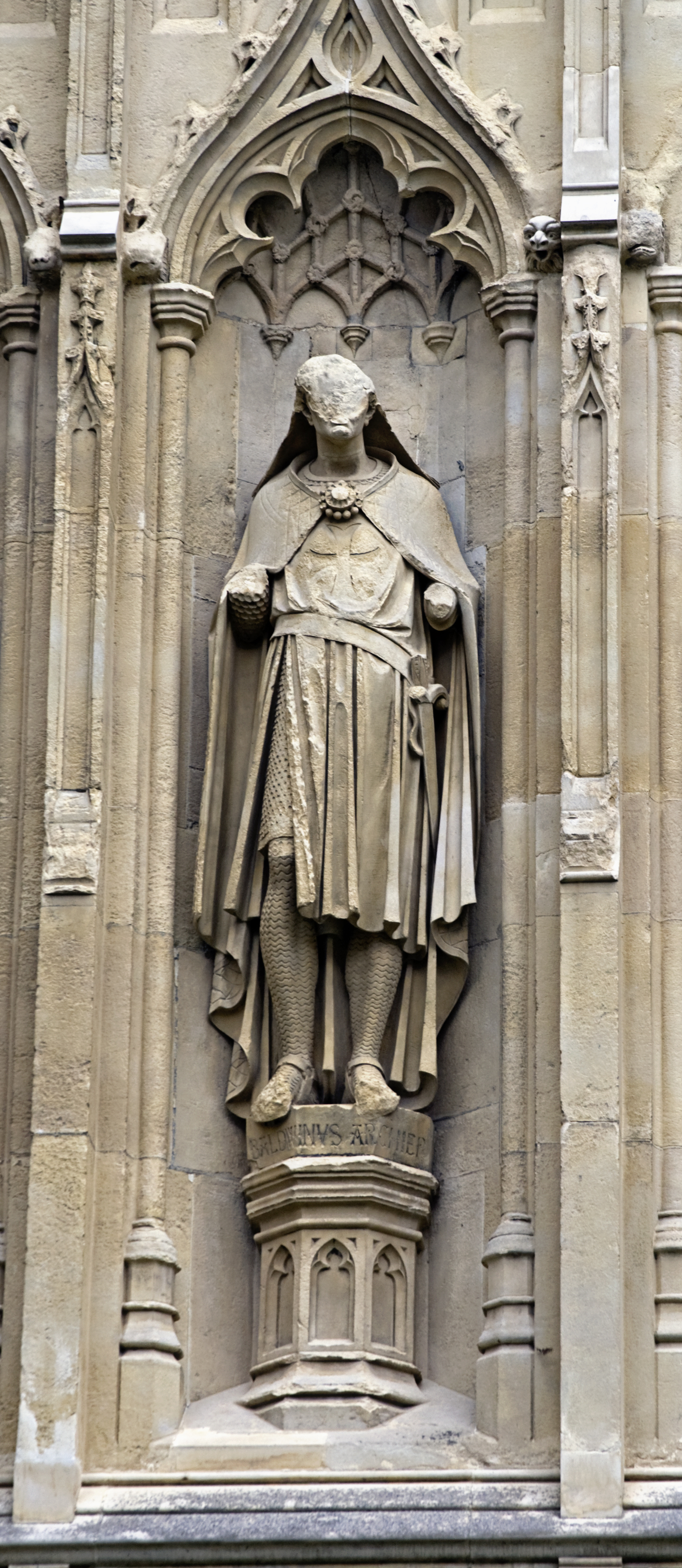
Damaged statue of Archbishop Baldwin from the exterior of Canterbury Cathedral

=== Participants ===
Archbishop Baldwin was selected to lead the tour for two principal reasons. As the Archbishop of Canterbury, he was the foremost churchman of England, and he had impressed Henry II when he preached the crusade at Geddington. He was also a Cistercian, an order prominent in Wales at the time and popular both in Anglo-Norman and Welsh regions.

Gerald of Wales, the Archdeacon of Brecon, was a sensible choice to accompany him. He was familiar with Wales and was related to both the Norman marcher lords and to the native Welsh princes. He had also proven himself loyal to the crown during Prince John's 1185 expedition to Ireland, and the crown could rely on him both to promote its interests and to leverage his connections. Gerald's nephew, William de Barri, joined the party at Haverfordwest, where Gerald was entrusted with his education.

Alexander, the Archdeacon of Bangor, may have been Welsh and was also a significant figure in the tour. He accompanied the party for most or all of it, serving as a translator.

Others participated for parts of the tour. From Hereford to New Radnor they were accompanied by Ranulph de Glanville, the Chief Justiciar of England, and Lord Rhys met the tour in Radnor before accompanying it from Cardigan to the River Dyfi. At Lampeter, the Cistercian abbots of Strata Florida and Whitland joined. At the same site Maelgwn, a son of Lord Rhys, agreed to accompany the tour and ask Henry II if his services were required on crusade.

Peter de Leia, the bishop of St Davids, accompanied the tour throughout South Wales, from Hereford to the River Dyfi, and likely had a greater role than suggested by Gerald in the Itinerarium Kambriae. William, the bishop of Llandaff, accompanied the tour through his diocese. Alexander Marx argues that Peter de Blois also participated in the tour, but went unmentioned by Gerald. The tour was also accompanied by an assortment of servants, who took care of the packhorses, and may also have been accompanied by guards.

=== Route ===
==== South Wales ====
The tour set out from Hereford in the first week of March 1188, following a Roman road to New Radnor. There, the party met Lord Rhys, who responded favourably to the crusade and expressed an intention to join, but deferred taking the cross until the tour entered his lands. Gerald records that he began preparing to go, but changed his mind after discussions with his wife and a kinsman who said "the worst thing that could happen to a crusader is come back alive". At New Radnor Baldwin celebrated mass and delivered a sermon, during which Gerald of Wales and then Peter de Leia took the cross in a stage-managed event intended to set an example to the audience.

The following day the tour travelled a few miles to Cruker Castle, where they stayed the night. During private audiences Baldwin convinced Hector and Maelgwn ap Cadwallon, prince of Maelienydd, to join the crusade. After Cruker Castle the tour continued to Hay-on-Wye and then went south-west, following the Wye Valley towards Llanddew, where they preached and spent the night, either at the bishop's palace or at Gerald's residence.

They then travelled on to Abergavenny via Coed Grwyne and Brecon, where they preached. They then continued to Usk Castle, where Baldwin, assisted by Alexander as translator, and William de Salso Marisco, Bishop of Llandaff, preached. Here Gerald recorded "notorious criminals ... robbers, highwaymen and murderers" taking the cross, suggesting a message of penance was preached. They then passed through Caerleon and crossed the River Usk three times on the way to Newport, where they preached.

From Newport, they crossed the River Rhymney and entered Cardiff before travelling on to Llandaff, where they preached and Baldwin said mass in the cathedral. From Llandaff the tour continued to Margam Abbey, before crossing the rivers Avon and Neath, arriving at Swansea Castle where they spent the night. At Swansea they preached and Baldwin celebrated mass. Gerald records that an elderly man offered a tithe for half the indulgence granted to crusaders. After his offer was accepted, he offered a second tithe for the other half.

The party continued through Kidwelly and Carmarthen, crossing the rivers Loughor and Tywi, and probably spending a night at each location. They then entered Haverfordwest where Baldwin preached and, according to Gerald, upon being met with an indifferent response called on Gerald to preach. Gerald claimed to have preached successfully in Latin and French, dividing his sermon into three parts and reserving "the strong power of persuasion for the close of each of these".

From Haverfordwest they continued to the cathedral city of St Davids, where Baldwin said mass but departed early to meet Lord Rhys at Cardigan, leaving Gerald to preach. Baldwin and Gerald then reunited at St Dogmael's before travelling together to Cardigan. There, Lord Rhys and three of his sons joined the tour for the remainder of its journey through the south. After leaving Cardigan, the party preached on the south side of a bridge over the River Teifi. According to Gerald, a chapel was marked out at the preaching site as a sign of devotion, with the altar where positioned Baldwin had preached.

The tour then continued to Lampeter, where Baldwin, Gerald, and the abbots of Whitland and Strata Florida preached. They then travelled to Strata Florida, where Gerald records they stayed a while "to repose themselves". According to Gerald, after departing Strata Florida the tour backtracked to Llanddewi Brefi, an important site in the mythology of St Davids, before continuing to Llanbadarn Fawr. Hurlock, however, questions whether this visit took place.

After spending the night at Llanbadarn Fawr, the party reached the River Dyfi, where Lord Rhys and Peter de Leia departed. The remaining members crossed by boat at the Dovey Estuary and entered North Wales. They had spent about five weeks in South Wales.

==== North Wales and return ====
Once in North Wales they continued on to Towyn, where they spent the night. The next day they were greeted by Gruffudd ap Cynan, who begged their forgiveness for his delay. Charles Kightly considers the apology sincere, citing Gruffudd's piety, whereas Kathryn Hurlock suggests that his delay was tactical, allowing him to express displeasure at the tour's intrusion into his lands without withdrawing support for its cause.

They were then ferried across the Afon Mawddach and passed around the Rhinog Mountains before coming to Llanfair, where they probably preached at a nearby bridge. From Llanfair they travelled to Nefyn, arriving on 9 April, the Saturday before Palm Sunday. They preached there on Palm Sunday before departing for Bangor.

The next day Baldwin preached and celebrated mass at Bangor Cathedral. He coerced the bishop of Bangor into taking the cross, prompting "outcry and loud expressions of grief from among his people". Baldwin also ordered the remains of Owain Gwynedd exhumed, for he had died excommunicate. They then crossed to Anglesey, where Rhodri ab Owain had assembled most of the population in a natural amphitheatre. Baldwin, Alexander, and Seissyll preached to the gathering. According to Gerald, many took the cross, though a group of men from Rhodri's household refused despite Baldwin's direct appeals. Gerald reported that three days later the men were defeated in a fight with bandits. Some were killed and others mortally wounded, with the survivors taking the cross. Gerald presented this outcome as divine vengeance for their earlier refusal.

They returned to Bangor on the same day and spent the night. The following morning they departed for Rhuddlan Castle where they preached their last sermon in Wales. The next day they travelled to Basingwerk Abbey via the cathedral city of St Asaph, where Baldwin celebrated mass.

The tour then left Wales and entered England, arriving in Chester on 14 April, Holy Thursday. They remained there for Easter, during which Baldwin preached. From Chester they went to Oswestry, travelling via Whitchurch to avoid entering Powys. At Oswestry they preached and Gruffudd ap Madog separated from his wife Angharad at the request of Baldwin, as she was his cousin and so the relationship was within the prohibited degrees of consanguinity.

From Oswestry they travelled to Shrewsbury, where they preached. Baldwin also excommunicated Owain Cyfeiliog, prince of Powys, who had refused to meet with Baldwin, which could have been a snub to both Baldwin's authority and to his mission. Other possible explanations include the tour not passing through his lands and his alliance with Henry II against the other Welsh princes. The party then returned to Hereford and concluded the journey. They had spent approximately a week in northern Wales.

=== Preaching and recruitment ===
The party preached in towns, castles, monasteries and cathedrals, where audiences assembled. Edbury considers it likely that messengers travelled ahead to summon people to hear the sermon. The choice of preaching locations reflected the availability of audiences and the party's intended route. Several of the selected towns also possessed mints and were therefore considered likely places to find people willing and able to donate to the crusade. Others were determined by location, with the tour preaching at Abergavenny, the "gateway to Wales", through which the most sensible route into Wales passed.

Some locations had a complicated intermix of factors. Haverfordwest was controlled by the Flemings, who had made significant contributions to the Second Crusade. The Flemings and Welsh of the area were also in conflict, and by preaching there Baldwin may have hoped to reduce that conflict and enable both to go on crusade.

Baldwin conducted the tour during Lent, a favoured time for crusade preaching because Easter was closely associated with repenting for sin. Although the sermons were not recorded, they probably drew on this association and included promises of indulgences. Other likely themes included the rewards of martyrdom and the messages of the Audita tremendi: penitence, right intent, and the need for peace in Europe. Henry II may have instructed Baldwin to emphasise this final aspect, as Henry needed peace in Wales to crusade.

They may also have invoked the Christian duty to recover the patrimony of Christ, a recurring theme in Crusade preaching. This may have been one of the arguments presented to Einion ab Einion Clud. Gerald records that Einion said to Lord Rhys, "My lord and father, with your permission I hasten to avenge the injury done to God the father almighty".

The sermons relied on established methods of crusade recruitment, including tripartite sermons and careful stage-management. Baldwin also employed local preachers. Hurlock argues this was because local preachers would be familiar with their audiences and because it would look less like Englishmen trying to impose the decisions of Henry II upon the Welsh.

Local clergy also served as interpreters, as Baldwin did not speak Welsh and Gerald's fluency in the language was limited. Interpreters were especially important in North Wales, where Welsh remained the predominant language, whereas French and English were more widely spoken in the south. Sermons could nevertheless encourage participation through dramatic and pious gestures, even without a shared language. In his Itinerarium Kambriae, Gerald describes men who were eager to take the cross after hearing a sermon in Latin, but reconsidered upon hearing the Welsh translation. Gerald attributed this to poor translation and the "superiority" of his Latin preaching. A more probable explanation is that they were swept up in the initial enthusiasm of the sermon and hesitated once the translation described what crusading involved.

Recruitment may also have been encouraged by reports of miracles at preaching sites, including at Haverfordwest where Gerald recorded a blind woman regaining her sight and at Cardigan where he reported "many miracles".

In addition to the public sermons, Baldwin used private audiences with influential members of Welsh society to convince them to participate. These meetings allowed Baldwin to tailor his appeals to individual recruits, as illustrated by his encounter with Arthenus. When Arthenus said that he should consult his friends before committing, Baldwin asked whether he should also consult his wife. Arthenus replied that the matter concerned men and there was no reason to consult women. Contemporary canon law required a wife's consent before her husband could depart on crusade. Gerald, who disapproved of this rule, presents Arthenus's response positively, saying that Baldwin had sought to subtly breach the rule. Kathryn Hurlock concurs with this interpretation, arguing that Baldwin had effectively shamed Arthenus into taking the cross.

== Outcome ==
Gerald of Wales boasted of the success of the tour, claiming that it was positively received and that 3,000 men took the cross. He also recorded that John, later King John, had rebuked him for his success, saying that "by his preaching he had emptied his lands of all the strength of men that was his defence against the Welsh". Whether Gerald's recruitment figure is true cannot be verified, although the tour was certainly successful in the short term and had a substantial response.

Whatever the true number recruited may be, it is certain that far fewer went on crusade. Gerald attributed this to the delay in the expedition setting out. Those who departed organised themselves into bands of crucesignati, comprising Welsh and Cambro-Normans, under Sir Bartholomew Mortimer and others. Welsh participation is recorded in contemporary accounts. Ambroise and the Itinerarium Peregrinorum et Gesta Regis Ricardi describe a contest between a Welsh archer and a Saracen outside Tyre.

Several factors prevented recruits from departing. Financial difficulties prevented some, including Gerald of Wales. Others may simply have lost their enthusiasm after the tour ended, and renewed conflict in France delayed the crusade itself. Changes in relations between the native Welsh and the English following the death of Henry II may have also encouraged some to stay home, either to protect their existing interests or to take advantage of the absence of others. Those who did not set out made recompense by participating in the repairs of St Davids Cathedral. Baldwin fulfilled his crusading vow and travelled to the Holy Land in June 1190. He died at the siege of Acre on 19 November 1190.

The most prominent among those recruited were Welsh princes, including Einion ab Einion Clud of Elfael, Maelgwn ap Cadwallon ap Madog of Maelienydd, and Gruffydd, a relative of Lord Rhys. It is unknown whether any Norman marcher lords were recruited. Some from areas visited by the tour are known to have participated, but Gerald makes no mention of them. Kathryn Hurlock speculates that this may have been because they would not suit the theme of the Itinerarium Kambriae, the "curiosities of Wales".

The opening page of the Descriptio Kambriae in NLW MS 3024C

According to Hurlock, there was genuine interest in the Third Crusade in Wales, but this was "held in check by fears of Anglo-Norman supremacy". She argues that Baldwin undermined his achievements through his attempts to extend his authority and his lack of tact, including his order to exhume Owain Gwynedd's remains. The tour received a more favourable response in the south than in the north. Hurlock attributes this weaker response partly to the limited Anglo-Norman influence there, the absence of allies like Lord Rhys, and earlier recruitment by Reiner, the bishop of St Asaph.

Hurlock describes the tour as the last large-scale crusade recruitment campaign in Wales, but argues that it nonetheless created an interest in crusading among the Welsh which continued into the next century. She also suggests that the tour's attempt to reduce unrest by recruiting potential troublemakers laid the groundwork for Archbishop Peckham's more overt offer to Dafydd ap Gruffydd in 1282.

Huw Pryce identifies Gerald's Itinerarium Kambriae, completed around 1191, as the tour's most "tangible and lasting result". The work contains accounts of Welsh history, geography and customs, and remains a source for the study of twelfth-century Wales.

== See also ==
- List of Crusades
- Chronology of the Crusades, 1187–1291
