= Rhys ap Gruffudd =

Prince of Deheubarth from 1155 to 1197

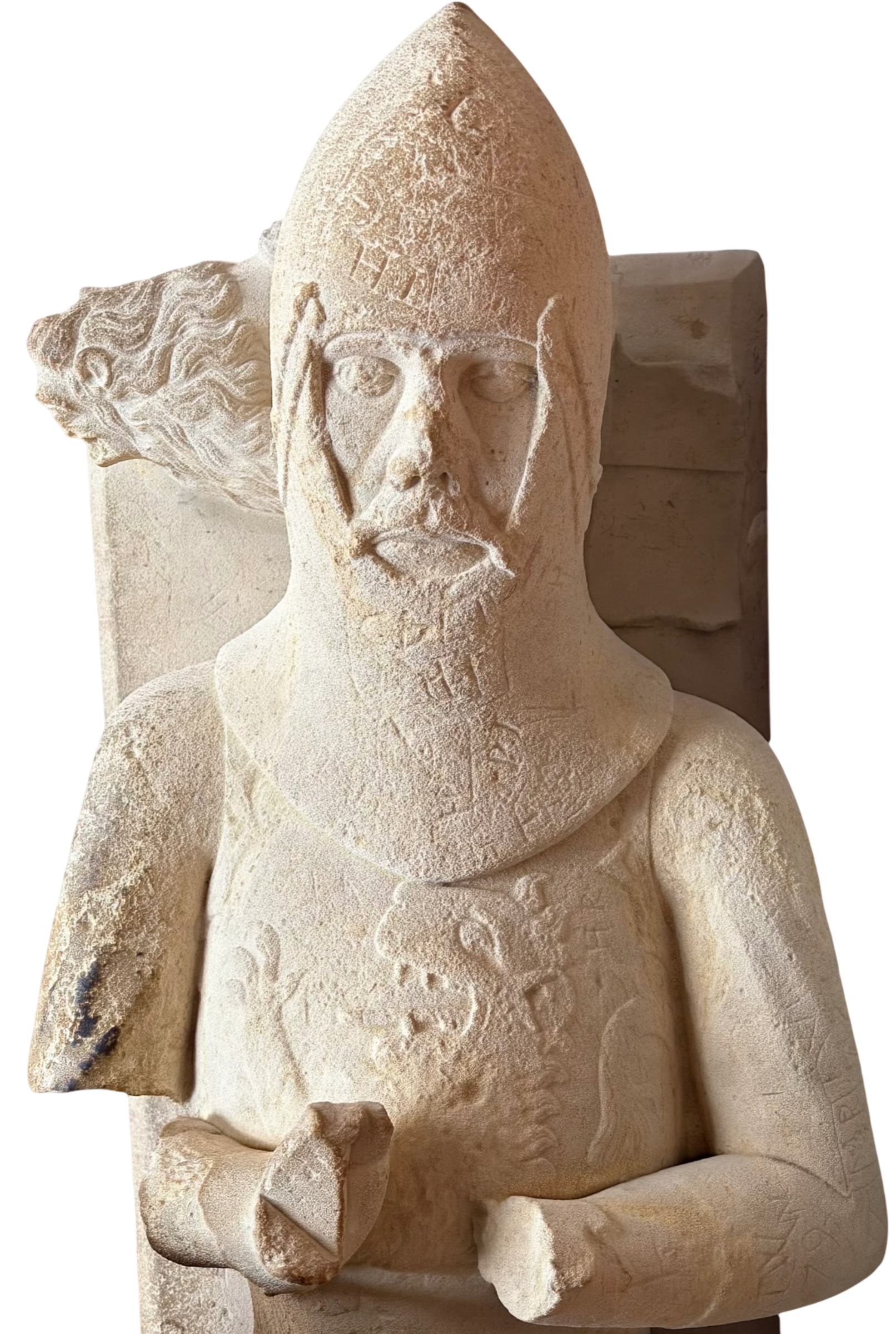
- 14th-century effigy identified as Rhys ap Gruffudd in St Davids Cathedral

Prince of Deheubarth
- Reign: 1155 – 28 April 1197
- Predecessor: Maredudd ap Gruffudd
- Successor: Gruffudd ap Rhys

Prince of Wales
- Pretence: ?1165 – 28 April 1197
- Predecessor: Owain Gwynedd
- Successor: Dafydd ap Llywelyn
- Born: c. 1132; Caeo, Cantref Mawr, Wales
- Died: 28 April 1197 (aged 64–65)
- Burial: St. David's, Pebidiog, Wales
- Spouse: Gwenllian ferch Madog
- Issue among others...: Gruffudd ap Rhys; Maelgwn ap Rhys; Rhys Gryg
- Dynasty: Cadelling
- Father: Gruffudd ap Rhys
- Mother: Gwenllian ferch Gruffudd

Rhys ap Gruffudd (Note: Welsh pronunciation: [ˈr̥ɨːs ap 'grɨfɨð]) (c. 1132 – 28 April 1197) or the Lord Rhys (Note: Welsh: Yr Arglwydd Rhys, pronounced [ər ˈarɡlʊɨ̯ð ˈr̥ɨːs]) (Note: This title may have not been used in his lifetime.) was the prince of the region of Deheubarth in south Wales from 1155 to 1197. He also referred to himself as the "Prince of Wales" or "Prince of the Welsh" in two surviving charters.

Rhys was one of the most successful and powerful Welsh rulers, and, after the death of Owain Gwynedd of Gwynedd in 1170, the dominant power in Wales. His grandfather, Rhys ap Tewdwr, was king of Deheubarth, and was killed at Brecon in 1093 by Bernard de Neufmarché. Following his death, most of Deheubarth was taken over by the Normans. Rhys's father, Gruffudd ap Rhys, eventually was able to become ruler of a small portion, and more territory was won back by Rhys's older brothers after Gruffudd's death. Rhys became ruler of Deheubarth in 1155. He was forced to submit to King Henry II of England in 1158. Henry invaded Deheubarth in 1163, stripped Rhys of all his lands and took him prisoner. A few weeks later he was released and given back a small part of his holdings. Rhys made an alliance with Owain Gwynedd and, after the failure of another invasion of Wales by Henry in 1165, was able to win back most of his lands.

In 1171 Rhys made peace with King Henry and was confirmed in possession of his recent conquests as well as being named Justiciar of South Wales. He maintained good relations with King Henry until the latter's death in 1189. Following Henry's death Rhys revolted against Richard I and attacked the Norman lordships surrounding his territory, capturing a number of castles. In his later years Rhys had trouble keeping control of his sons, particularly Maelgwn and Gruffudd, who maintained a feud with each other. Rhys launched his last campaign against the Normans in 1196 and captured a number of castles. The following year he died unexpectedly and was buried in St Davids Cathedral.

== Genealogy and early life ==
Rhys was the fourth son of Gruffydd ap Rhys, ruler of part of Deheubarth, by his wife Gwenllian ferch Gruffudd, daughter of Gruffudd ap Cynan, king of Gwynedd. His next older brother was Maredudd ap Gruffydd, and there were older brothers, Morgan and Maelgwn, who were killed in battle with their mother in 1136. He also had two older half-brothers, Anarawd and Cadell, from his father's first marriage. Rhys married Gwenllian ferch Madog, daughter of Madog ap Maredudd, the last Prince of all Powys.

Deheubarth was one of the traditional kingdoms of Wales, shown here as they were in 1093 when Rhys ap Tewdwr died.

His grandfather, Rhys ap Tewdwr, had been king of all Deheubarth until his death in 1093. Rhys ap Tewdwr was killed in Brycheiniog, and most of his kingdom was taken over by Norman lords. Gruffudd ap Rhys was forced to flee to Ireland. He later returned to Deheubarth and ruled a portion of the kingdom, but was forced to flee to Ireland again in 1127. When Rhys was born in 1132, his father held only the commote of Caeo in Cantref Mawr.

The death of King Henry I of England, and the ensuing Anarchy arising from the rival claims of Stephen and Matilda to the English throne, gave the Welsh the opportunity to rise against the Normans. A revolt spread through south Wales in 1136, and Gruffudd ap Rhys, aided by his two eldest sons, Anarawd and Cadell, defeated the Normans in a battle near Loughor, killing over five hundred. After driving Walter de Clifford out of Cantref Bychan, Gruffudd set off to Gwynedd to enlist the help of his father-in-law, Gruffudd ap Cynan. In the absence of her husband, Gwenllian led an army against the Norman lordship of Cydweli (Kidwelly), taking along her two oldest sons, Morgan and Maelgwn. She was defeated and killed by an army commanded by Maurice de Londres of Oystermouth Castle. Morgan was also killed and Maelgwn captured.

Gruffudd formed an alliance with Gwynedd, and later in 1136 the sons of Gruffudd ap Cynan, Owain Gwynedd and Cadwaladr ap Gruffudd, led an army to Ceredigion. Their combined forces won a decisive victory over the Normans at the Battle of Crug Mawr. Ceredigion was reclaimed from the Normans, but was annexed by Gwynedd as the senior partner in the alliance. Gruffudd ap Rhys continued his campaign against the Normans in 1137, but died later that year. The leadership of the family now passed to Rhys' half-brother Anarawd ap Gruffudd. In 1143, when Rhys was eleven, Anarawd was murdered, a death arranged for by Cadwaladr ap Gruffudd, brother of Owain Gwynedd, king of Gwynedd. Owain punished Cadwaladr by depriving him of his lands in Ceredigion.

== First battles (1146–1155) ==
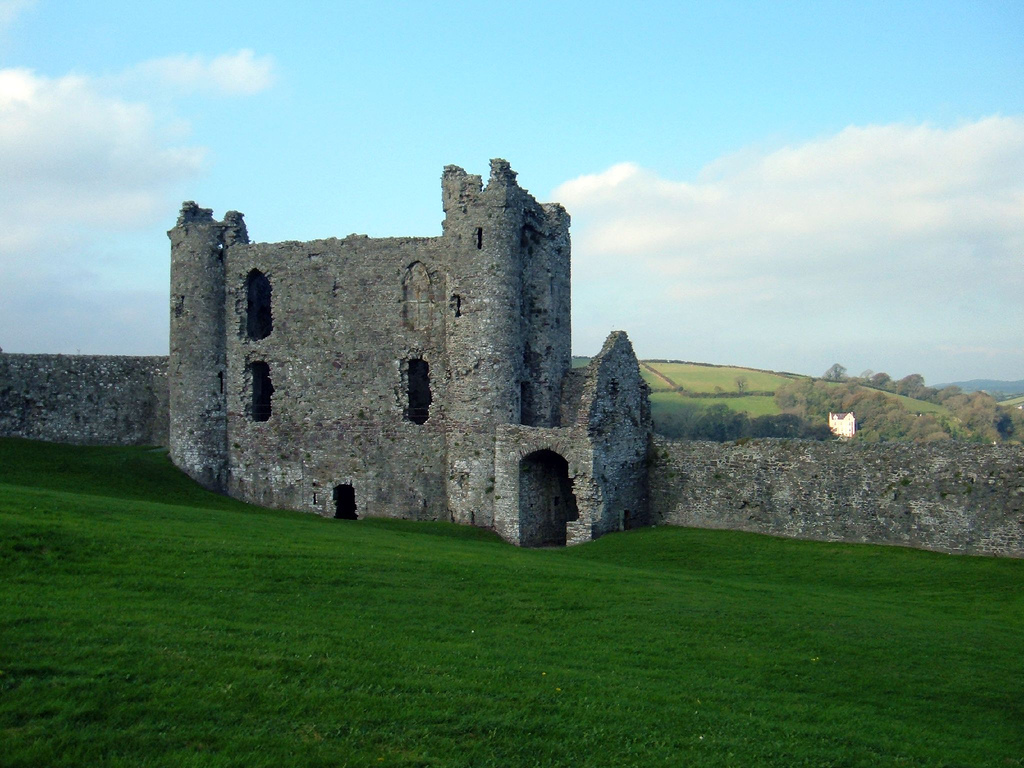
Rhys gained his first recorded military experience at the age of fourteen when he participated in the storming of Llansteffan Castle in 1146.

Anarawd's brother, Cadell ap Gruffydd, took over as head of the family. Gilbert de Clare, Earl of Pembroke, rebuilt Carmarthen Castle in 1145, then began a campaign to reclaim Ceredigion. He built a castle in the commote of Mabudryd, but Cadell, aided by Hywel ab Owain Gwynedd who held Ceredigion for Gwynedd, destroyed it in 1146. Rhys appears in the annals for the first time in 1146, fighting alongside his brothers Cadell and Maredudd in the capture by assault of Llansteffan Castle. This was followed by the capture of Wiston in 1147, Carmarthen in 1150 and Loughor in 1151. In 1151 Cadell was attacked while out hunting by a group of Norman and Flemish knights from Tenby, and left for dead. He survived, but suffered injuries which left him unable to play an active role, and in 1153 he left on a pilgrimage to Rome.

Maredudd became ruler of Deheubarth and continued a campaign, begun in 1150, aimed at recovering Ceredigion, which had been held by Gwynedd since 1136. Maredudd and Rhys drove Hywel ab Owain Gwynedd from Ceredigion by 1153. The same year Rhys is recorded as an independent commander for the first time, leading an army to capture the Norman castle of St Clears. Maredudd and Rhys also destroyed the castles at Tenby and Aberafan that year. Maredudd died in 1155 at the age of twenty-five and left Rhys as ruler of Deheubarth. Around this time he married Gwenllian ferch Madog, daughter of Madog ap Maredudd, prince of Powys.

== Early reign ==
=== Loss of territory (1155–1163) ===
Shortly after becoming ruler of Deheubarth, Rhys heard rumours that Owain Gwynedd was planning to invade Ceredigion in order to reclaim it for Gwynedd. Rhys responded by building a castle at Aberdyfi in 1156. The threatened invasion did not take place, and Turvey claims that Owain's intention may have been to test the resolve of the new ruler.

King Stephen had died in October 1154, bringing to an end the long dispute with the Empress Matilda which had helped Anarawd, Cadell and Maredudd to extend their rule in Deheubarth. With disunity within the realm no longer a problem, the new king of England, Henry II, soon turned his attention to Wales. He began with an invasion of Gwynedd in 1157. This invasion was not entirely successful, but Owain Gwynedd was induced to seek terms and to give up some territory in the north-east of Wales.

The following year, Henry prepared an invasion of Deheubarth. Rhys made plans to resist, but was persuaded by his council to meet the king to discuss peace terms. The terms were much harsher than those offered to Owain: Rhys was stripped of all his possessions apart from Cantref Mawr, though he was promised one other cantref. The other territories were returned to their Norman lords.

Among the Normans who returned to their holdings was Walter de Clifford, who reclaimed Cantref Bychan, then invaded Rhys's lands in Cantref Mawr. An appeal to the king produced no response, and Rhys resorted to arms, first capturing Clifford's castle at Llandovery then seizing Ceredigion. King Henry responded by preparing another invasion, and Rhys submitted without resistance. He was obliged to give hostages, probably including his son Hywel.

The king was absent in France in 1159, and Rhys took the opportunity to attack Dyfed and then to lay siege to Carmarthen, which was saved by a relief force led by Earl Reginald of Cornwall. Rhys retreated to Cantref Mawr, where an army led by five earls, the Earls of Cornwall, Gloucester, Hertford, Pembroke and Salisbury, marched against him. The earls were assisted by Cadwaladr, brother of Owain Gwynedd, and Owain's sons, Hywel and Cynan. However, they were forced to withdraw and a truce was arranged. In 1162, Rhys again attempted to recover some of his lost lands, and captured Llandovery castle. The following year Henry II returned to England after an absence of four years and prepared for another invasion of Deheubarth. Rhys met the king to discuss terms and was obliged to give more hostages, including another son, Maredudd. He was then seized and taken to England as a prisoner. Henry appears to have been uncertain what to do with Rhys, but after a few weeks decided to free him and allow him to rule Cantref Mawr. Rhys was summoned to appear before Henry at Woodstock to do homage together with Owain Gwynedd and Malcolm IV of Scotland.

=== Welsh uprising (1164–1170) ===
In 1164 all the Welsh princes united in an uprising. Warren suggests that when Rhys and Owain were obliged to do homage to Henry in 1163 they were forced to accept a status of dependent vassalage instead of their previous client status, and that this led to the revolt. Rhys had other reasons for rebellion, for he had returned to Deheubarth from England to find that the neighbouring Norman lords were threatening Cantref Mawr. His nephew, Einion ab Anarawd, who was the captain of his bodyguard, had been murdered at the instigation of Roger de Clare, Earl of Hertford. The murderer had been given the protection of the Clares in Ceredigion. Rhys first appealed to the king to intercede; when this failed, he invaded Ceredigion and recaptured all of it apart from the town and castle of Cardigan. The Welsh revolt led to another invasion of Wales by King Henry in 1165. Henry attacked Gwynedd first, but instead of following the usual invasion route along the north coast he attacked from the south, following a route over the Berwyn hills. He was met by the united forces of the Welsh princes, led by Owain Gwynedd and including Rhys. According to Brut y Tywysogion:

... [King Henry] gathered an innumerable host of the selected warriors of England and Normandy and Flanders and Gascony and Anjou ... and against him came Owain and Cadwaladr the sons of Gruffudd with all the host of Gwynedd, and Rhys ap Gruffudd with all the host of Deheubarth and Iorwerth the Red son of Maredudd and the sons of Madog ap Maredudd with all the host of Powys.

Torrential rain forced Henry's army to retreat in disorder without fighting a major battle, and Henry vented his spleen on the hostages, having Rhys's son Maredudd blinded. Rhys's other son, Hywel, was not among the victims. Rhys returned to Deheubarth where he captured and burned Cardigan Castle. He allowed the garrison to depart, but held the castellan, Robert Fitz-Stephen, as a prisoner. Shortly afterwards Rhys captured Cilgerran castle.

In 1167 he joined Owain Gwynedd in an attack on Owain Cyfeiliog of southern Powys, and spent three weeks helping Owain besiege the Norman castle of Rhuddlan. In 1168 he attacked the Normans at Builth, destroying its castle. Rhys benefited from the Norman invasion of Ireland in 1169 and 1170, which was largely led by the Cambro-Norman lords of south Wales. In 1167 the King of Leinster, Diarmait Mac Murchada, who had been driven out of his kingdom, had asked Rhys to release Robert Fitz-Stephen from captivity to take part in an expedition to Ireland. Rhys did not oblige at the time, but released him the following year and in 1169 Fitz-Stephen led the vanguard of a Norman army which landed in Wexford. The leader of the Norman forces, Richard de Clare, 2nd Earl of Pembroke, known as "Strongbow", followed in 1170. According to Warren, "they were prompted to go by a growing suspicion that King Henry did not intend to renew his offensive against the Welsh, but was instead seeking an accommodation with the Welsh leaders". The departure of the Norman lords enabled Rhys to strengthen his position, and the death of Owain Gwynedd in late 1170 left him as the acknowledged leader of the Welsh princes.

== Later reign ==
=== Peace with King Henry (1171–1188) ===
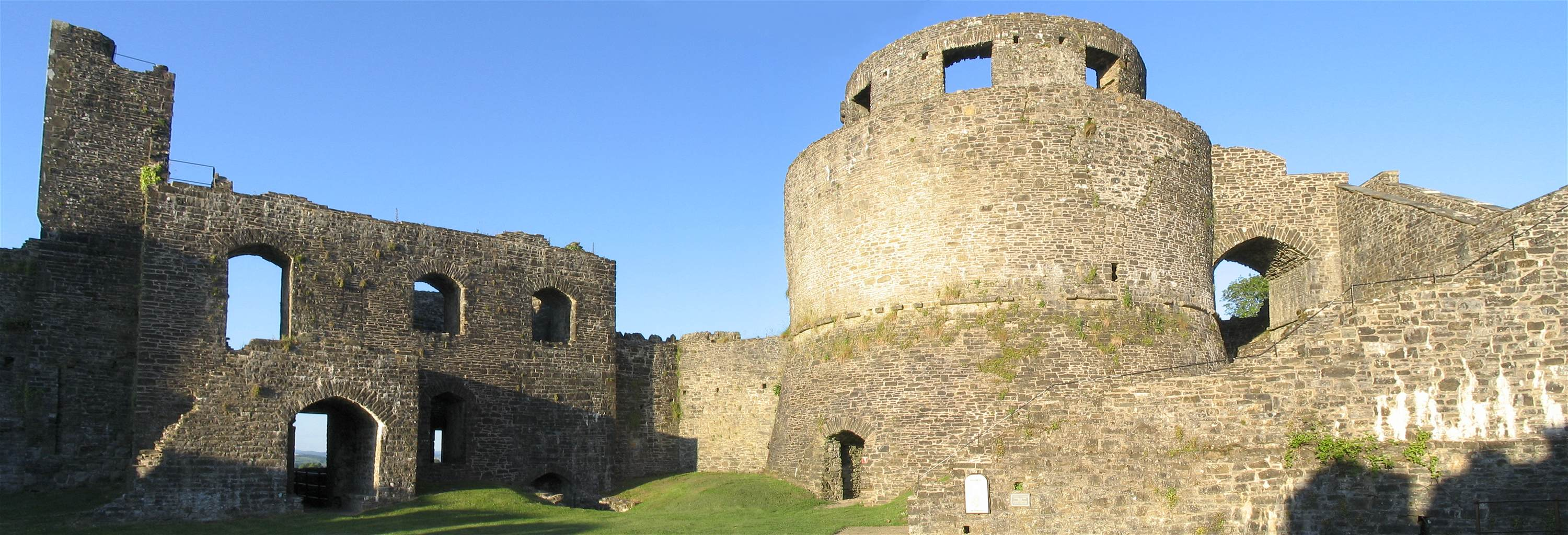
Dinefwr Castle was the chief seat of the Dinefwr dynasty; the earliest surviving part of the present castle may have been built by Rhys or by his son, Rhys Gryg.

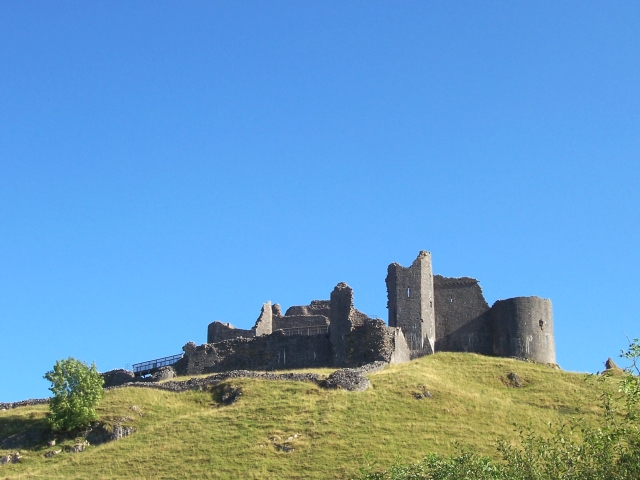
Carreg Cennen Castle

In 1171 King Henry II arrived in England from France, on his way to Ireland. Henry wished to ensure that Richard de Clare, who had married Diarmait's daughter and become heir to Leinster, did not establish an independent Norman kingdom in Ireland. His decision to try a different approach in his dealings with the Welsh was influenced by the events in Ireland, although Warren suggests that "it seems likely that Henry began rethinking his attitude to the Welsh soon after the débâcle of 1165". Henry now wished to make peace with Rhys, who came to Newnham to meet him. Rhys was to pay a tribute of 300 horses and 4,000 head of cattle, but was confirmed in possession of all the lands he had taken from Norman lords, including the Clares. They met again in October that year at Pembroke as Henry waited to cross to Ireland. Rhys had collected 86 of the 300 horses, but Henry agreed to take only 36 of them and remitted the remainder of the tribute until after his return from Ireland. Rhys's son, Hywel, who had been held as a hostage for many years, was returned to him. Henry and Rhys met once more at Laugharne as Henry returned from Ireland in 1172, and shortly afterwards Henry appointed Rhys "justice on his behalf in all Deheubarth". According to A. D. Carr:

This meant the delegation to him of any authority which the king might have claimed over his fellow Welsh rulers; it might also have involved some authority over the king's Anglo-Norman subjects ... Rhys was more than a native Welsh ruler; he was one of the great feudatories of the Angevin empire.

The agreement between Henry and Rhys was to last until Henry's death in 1189. When Henry's sons rebelled against him in 1173 Rhys sent his son Hywel Sais to Normandy to aid the king, then in 1174 personally led an army to Tutbury in Staffordshire to assist at the siege of the stronghold of the rebel Earl William de Ferrers. When Rhys returned to Wales after the fall of Tutbury, he left a thousand men with the king for service in Normandy. King Henry held a council at Gloucester in 1175 which was attended by a large gathering of Welsh princes, led by Rhys. It appears to have concluded with the swearing of a mutual assistance pact for the preservation of peace and order in Wales. In 1177 Rhys, Dafydd ab Owain, who had emerged as the main power in Gwynedd, and Cadwallon ap Madog from Rhwng Gwy a Hafren swore fealty and liege homage to Henry at a council held at Oxford. At this council the king gave Meirionnydd, part of the kingdom of Gwynedd, to Rhys.

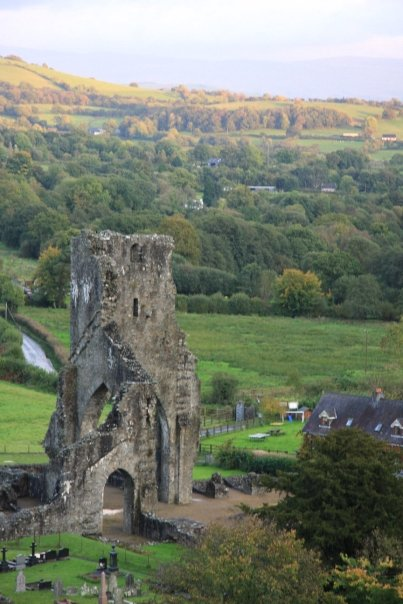
Talley Abbey

Rhys built a number of stone castles, starting with Cardigan Castle, which was the earliest-recorded native-built stone castle in Wales. He also built Carreg Cennen Castle near Llandeilo, a castle set in a spectacular position on a mountain top. He held a festival of poetry and song at his court at Cardigan over Christmas 1176. This is generally regarded as the first recorded Eisteddfod. The festival was announced a year in advance throughout Wales and in England, Scotland, Ireland and possibly France. Two chairs were awarded as prizes, one for the best poem and the other for the best musical performance. J. E. Caerwyn Williams suggests that this event may be an adaptation of the similar French puys with the troubadours, although these may be parallel developments, since records of puys only appear around the late 12th century as well, and Welsh baridic tradition of competition seems to be much older, possibly back to the 6th century under Maelgwn Gwynedd. R.R. Davies suggests that the texts of Welsh law, traditionally codified by Hywel Dda at Whitland, were first assembled in book form under the aegis of Rhys.

Rhys founded two religious houses during this period. Talley Abbey was the first Premonstratensian abbey in Wales, while Llanllyr was a Cistercian nunnery, only the second nunnery to be founded in Wales and the first to prosper. He became the patron of the abbeys of Whitland and Strata Florida and made large grants to both houses. Giraldus Cambrensis, who was related to Rhys, gives an account of his meetings with Rhys in 1188 when Giraldus accompanied Archbishop Baldwin around Wales to raise men for the Third Crusade. Some Welsh clerics were not happy about this visit, but Rhys was enthusiastic and gave the Archbishop a great deal of assistance. Giraldus says that Rhys decided to go on crusade himself and spent several weeks making preparations, but was eventually persuaded to change his mind by his wife Gwenllian, "by female artifices".

=== Final campaigns (1189–1196) ===
A map depicting the final campaigns of Rhys and his sons following Henry II's death.

Henry II died in 1189 and was succeeded by Richard I. Rhys considered that he was no longer bound by the agreement with King Henry and attacked the Norman lordships surrounding his territory. He ravaged Pembroke, Haverfordwest and Gower, and captured the castles of St. Clear's, Laugharne and Llansteffan. Richard's brother, Prince John (later King John), came to Wales in September and tried to make peace. He persuaded Rhys to raise the siege of Carmarthen and accompany him to Oxford to meet Richard. Rhys arrived at Oxford to discover that Richard was not prepared to travel there to meet him, and hostilities continued.

In his later years Rhys had trouble keeping control of his sons, particularly Maelgwn and Gruffudd. In 1189 Gruffudd persuaded Rhys to imprison Maelgwn, and he was given into Gruffudd's keeping at Dinefwr. Gruffudd handed him over to his father-in-law, William de Braose. Gruffudd is also said to have persuaded his father to annex the lordship of Cemais and its chief castle of Nevern, held by William FitzMartin, in 1191. This action was criticised by Giraldus Cambrensis, who describes Gruffudd as "a cunning and artful man". William FitzMartin was married to Rhys's daughter Angharad, and, according to Giraldus, Rhys "had solemnly sworn, by the most precious relics, that his indemnity and security should be faithfully maintained". Rhys had also annexed the Norman lordships of Cydweli and Carnwyllion in 1190. In 1192 Rhys secured Maelgwn's release, but by now Maelgwn and Gruffudd were bitter enemies. In 1194 Rhys was defeated in battle by Maelgwn and Hywel, who imprisoned him in Nevern castle, though Hywel later released his father without Maelgwn's consent. Giraldus suggests that Rhys's incarceration in Nevern castle was divine vengeance for the dispossession of William FitzMartin. In 1195 two other sons, Rhys Gryg and Maredudd, seized Llanymddyfri and Dinefwr, and Rhys responded by imprisoning them. Rhys launched his last campaign against the Normans in 1196. He captured a number of castles, including Carmarthen, Colwyn, Radnor and Painscastle, and defeated an army led by Roger de Mortimer and Hugh de Say near Radnor, with forty knights among the dead. This was Rhys' last battle. William de Braose offered terms, and Painscastle was returned to him.

=== Death and aftermath (1197) ===
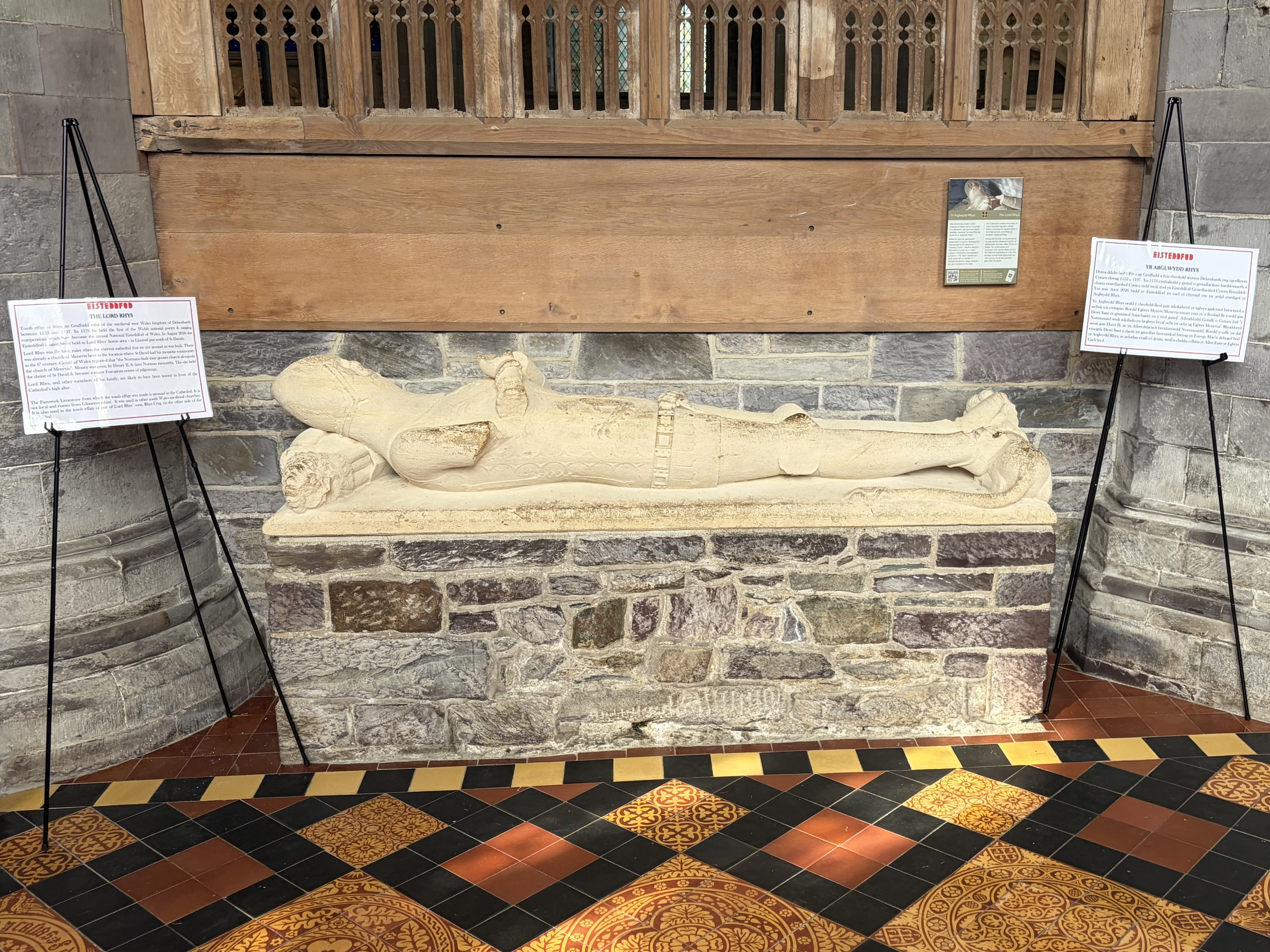
Rhys' supposed tomb in St Davids

Rhys died on 28 April 1197, unexpectedly, and was buried in St Davids Cathedral. The chronicler of Brut y Tywysogion records for 1197:

... there was a great pestilence throughout the island of Britain ... and that tempest killed innumerable people and many of the nobility and many princes, and spared none. That year, four days before May Day, died Rhys ap Gruffudd, Prince of Deheubarth and unconquered head of all Wales.

Rhys died excommunicate, having quarreled with the Bishop of St Davids, Peter de Leia, over the theft of some of the bishop's horses some years previously. Before he could be buried in the cathedral, the bishop had his corpse scourged in posthumous penance.

Rhys had nominated his eldest legitimate son, Gruffudd ap Rhys, as his successor, and soon after his father's death Gruffudd met the Justiciar, Archbishop Hubert Walter, on the border and was confirmed as heir. Maelgwn, the eldest son but illegitimate, refused to accept this and was given military assistance by Gwenwynwyn ab Owain of Powys. Maelgwn took the town and castle of Aberystwyth and captured Gruffudd, whom he handed over to the custody of Gwenwynwyn. Gwenwynwyn later handed him over to the king, who imprisoned him at Corfe Castle.

There are no surviving bardic elegies to Rhys, though the Peniarth 20 version of Brut y Tywysogion contains a Latin eulogy on his sepulchre:

Grande decus tenet iste locus, si cernitur ortus
Si quis sit finis queritur ecce cinis
Laudis amator honoris odor dulcedinis auctor.
Resus in hoc tumulo conditur exiguo
Cesaries quasi congeries solis radiorum
Principis et facies vertitur in cineres
Hic tegitur sed detegitur quia fama perhennis.
Non sinit illustrem voce latere ducem
Colligitur tumba cinis hac sed transuolat ultra
Nobilitas claudi nescia fune breui.
Wallia iam viduata dolet ruitura dolore.

— Peniarth 20 Brut y Tywysogion, page 205.
Translation:

If its source is sought, that place has great majesty;
If one asks what is its end, here are his ashes:
One who loved a fair name, one fragrant with distinction, a fount of gentleness,
Rhys is buried in this small tomb;
The prince’s hair, like a mass of the sun’s rays,
And his face are turned to ashes
Here he lies hidden, but he is revealed, for his fame is for ever,
It does not allow the ruler, famed for his words, to lie concealed.
His ashes are collected in this tomb but his nobility flies beyond it
Refusing to be confined by a short rope.
Wales now widowed, grieves, doomed to be destroyed by grief.

— Translation by Paul Russell

Both Rhys and his son Rhys Gryg were entombed in St Davids, and the tombs of both possess slabs with stone carvings of men in late fourteenth-century armour. The creation of these slabs may be attributed to Richard Talbot, father of John Talbot; the family claimed descent from Rhys ap Gruffudd and asserted that the Talbot arms were those of the old dynasty of Deheubarth.

== Character and historical assessment ==
Giraldus Cambrensis frequently mentions Rhys in his writings and describes him as "a man of excellent wit and quick in repartee". Gerald tells the story of a banquet at Hereford in 1186 where Rhys sat between two members of the Clare family. What could have been a tense affair, since Rhys had seized lands in Ceredigion previously held by the Clare family, passed off with an exchange of courteous compliments, followed by some good-natured banter between Rhys and Gerald about their family connections. Rhys gave Gerald and Archbishop Baldwin a great deal of assistance when they visited Wales to raise troops for the crusade in 1188, and Gerald several times refers to his "kindness" and says that Rhys accompanied them all the way from Cardigan to the northern border of Ceredigion "with a liberality peculiarly praiseworthy in so illustrious a prince".

Another contemporary writer also wrote of Rhys if Roger Turvey is correct in stating that Walter Map's piece Of the King Appollonides deals with Rhys under a pseudonym. Map was less favourably disposed toward Rhys, describing him as "This king I have seen and know, and hate", but goes on to say "I would not have my hatred blacken his worth; it is not my wish ever to suppress any man's excellence through envy". He tells the following story about Apollonides/Rhys:

This same man gave provisions to his enemies when besieged and driven by risk of famine to capitulate; he wished them to be overcome by his own strength and not by want of bread; and though he deferred victory, he increased the renown of it.

Davies provides the following assessment of Rhys:

Rhys's career was indeed a remarkable one. Its very length was a tribute to his stamina and skill: he had occupied the stage of Welsh politics for over fifty years, from his first appearance in his early 'teens, at the capture of Llansteffan castle in 1146, to his death in 1197. But it was his achievement which was astounding: he had reconstituted the kingdom of Deheubarth and made it the premier Welsh kingdom. For once, the poet's compliment was well deserved: Rhys had restored "the majesty of the South".

Davies also notes two flaws in Rhys's achievement. One was the personal nature of his accord with Henry II, which meant that it did not survive Henry's death. The other was his inability to control his sons or to force them to accept Gruffudd as his successor.

== Children ==
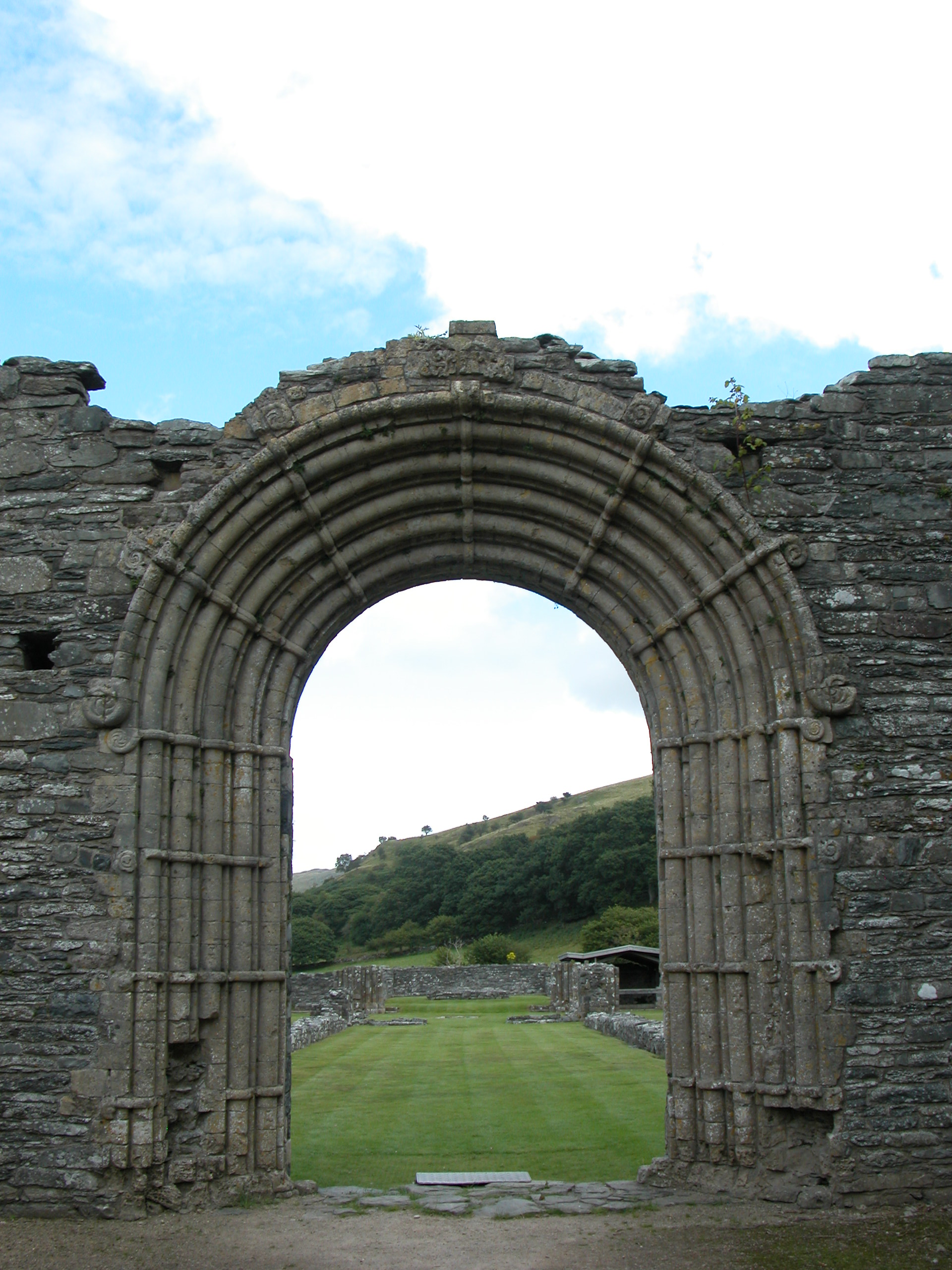
Several of Rhys's children, including Gruffudd and Maelgwn, were buried at Strata Florida Abbey.

Rhys had at least nine sons and eight daughters. Three of the sons were named Maredudd and two of the daughters were named Gwenllian.

- Gruffydd ap Rhys II (died 1201) was the eldest legitimate son and was nominated by Rhys as his successor. He married Maud de Braose, the daughter of William de Braose and Maud de Braose.
- Maelgwn ap Rhys (died 1231), who was the eldest son but illegitimate.
- Rhys Gryg (died 1233) married a daughter of the Earl of Clare.
- Hywel ap Rhys (died 1231)
- Maredudd ap Rhys (died 1239)
- Another Maredudd (died 1227) became Archdeacon of Cardigan.
- Rhys's daughter Nest or Annest ferch Rhys married Rhodri ab Owain, prince of the western part of Gwynedd.
- Gwenllian (circa 1178 – 1236) who married Ednyfed Fychan, seneschal of Gwynedd under Llywelyn the Great, and through her, Rhys became an ancestor of the Tudor dynasty. Through the Tudors inter-marrying with the House of Stuart Rhys is an ancestor to the current ruling house of the United Kingdom and also an ancestor of several ruling houses in Europe. When Henry Tudor landed in Pembrokeshire, Wales in 1485 to make a bid for the throne, his descent from Rhys was one of the factors which enabled him to attract Welsh support (Henry flew a (Welsh) dragon banner at the battle of Bosworth Field).
- Angharad ferch Rhys married William FitzMartin, lord of Cemais.
- Other daughters married the Welsh rulers of Gwrtheyrnion and Elfael.

== In Fiction ==
The Lord Rhys was set as the subject on which an epic poem needed to be written to win the Crown at the National Eisteddfod of Wales in 1909. The victorious poem by W. J. Gruffydd has been described as the best of the poems which won the Crown in the first decade of the twentieth century.

== Notes ==
Regnal titles
Preceded by Maredudd ap Gruffudd	Prince of Deheubarth; 1155 – 1197	Succeeded by Gruffudd ap Rhys ap Gruffudd
Preceded by Owain Gwynedd	Prince of Wales (self-proclaimed) c. 1171 – 1197	Succeeded by Dafydd ap Llywelyn
