= Saladin tithe =

1188 crusade tax in England and France

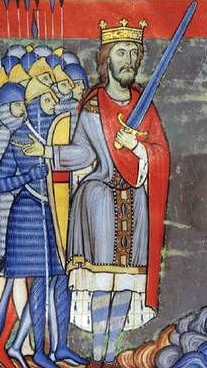
Henry II of England

The Saladin tithe, or the Aid of 1188, was a tax (more specifically a tallage) levied in England and, to some extent, France, in 1188, in response to the capture of Jerusalem by Saladin in 1187.

== Background ==
In July 1187, the Kingdom of Jerusalem's army was defeated by Saladin at the Battle of Hattin; in October, Saladin captured Jerusalem itself. When news of the city's capture reached Europe by the end of the year, a new crusade was promulgated. In January 1188, Henry II of England and Philip II of France discussed the crusade at Le Mans, with Joscius, Archbishop of Tyre in attendance; on February 11, Henry began to organize crusade preaching in England at Geddington. There he also discussed the "Saladin tithe."

== Collection of the tithe ==
The Saladin tithe was a literal tithe of 10% on revenues and movable properties. The tithe was assessed by dioceses, rather than by shires, and local sheriffs had no role in the collection of the tithe. The money was collected instead by the local priest or bishop, the dean of the local church, the local baron, and a sergeant of the king, as well as, notably, a Knight Templar and a Knight Hospitaller, whose orders were especially concerned with the defense of the Holy Land. Assessments were made by oaths in rural areas, and by a jury in urban areas. Certain items were exempt from assessment:

This year each man shall give in alms a tenth of his revenues and movables with the exception of the arms, horses and garments of the knights, and likewise with the exception of the horses, books, garments and vestments, and all appurtenances of whatever sort used by clerks in divine service, and the precious stones belonging to both clerks and laymen.

Anyone who joined the crusade was exempt from the tithe altogether. This was meant to encourage participation, and many did indeed join in order to avoid the tallage. All other landowners, both clerics and laymen, had to pay the tithe; if anyone disagreed with the assessment of their property, they were imprisoned or excommunicated. While taxes were usually collected by the Exchequer, a separate office with ten tellers was set up to collect the tithe in Salisbury.

According to Gervase of Canterbury, £70,000 was collected from Christians, and another £60,000 was collected from Jews. The amount collected from Jews was more likely £10,000, with another £2,000 collected in 1190. (£82k ≈ £150m 2016). At the time, this was the largest-ever tax collected in England, although Henry had previously levied other taxes for assistance to the Holy Land, in 1166 and 1185. The tithe was extremely unpopular, despite the general acknowledgement that it was, at least in English eyes, for a worthy cause. Because assessments were made by dioceses, Baldwin of Exeter, the Archbishop of Canterbury, was especially blamed. He spent most of the year (perhaps wisely) in Wales, preaching the crusade in Wales, accompanied by the chronicler Giraldus Cambrensis.

The same tithe was levied in France, but Philip did not have the same centralized government there, and faced much opposition which he could not control. The tithe was also levied less successfully in England's territories in France. Henry suggested that William the Lion levy the tithe in Scotland, but William refused, as English power did not yet extend so far north as to force the tithe upon the Scots.

== Aftermath ==
In the end, Henry never went on crusade. In 1189, he was involved in a war with Philip and his own son Richard the Lionheart, and was accused of spending the tithe on provisions for this war. Henry died later in the year before the crusade was underway; according to Girardus, this was divine punishment for such a harsh tithe. Richard succeeded him and found the treasury full, although he collected even more money by selling land and imposing various fines throughout England. Altogether, Henry and Richard succeeded in raising 100,000 silver marks with the Saladin tithe.

The subsequent Third Crusade helped capture the Mediterranean coast for the remnant of the Kingdom of Jerusalem, but King Richard could not conquer Jerusalem. On his return home he was taken hostage by Henry VI, Holy Roman Emperor. In 1194, another massive tax was imposed on England in order to raise his ransom money. It was essentially a repeat of the Saladin tithe of 1188, but in this case the tax was set at the much higher rate of 25%. The same organizational structure and machinery of collection was used to raise money for King John's wars in France in 1207.

== See also ==
- Taxation in medieval England
- Archbishop Baldwin's 1188 tour of Wales
