= Castle Green House =

Coordinates: 52.0818°N 4.6605°W

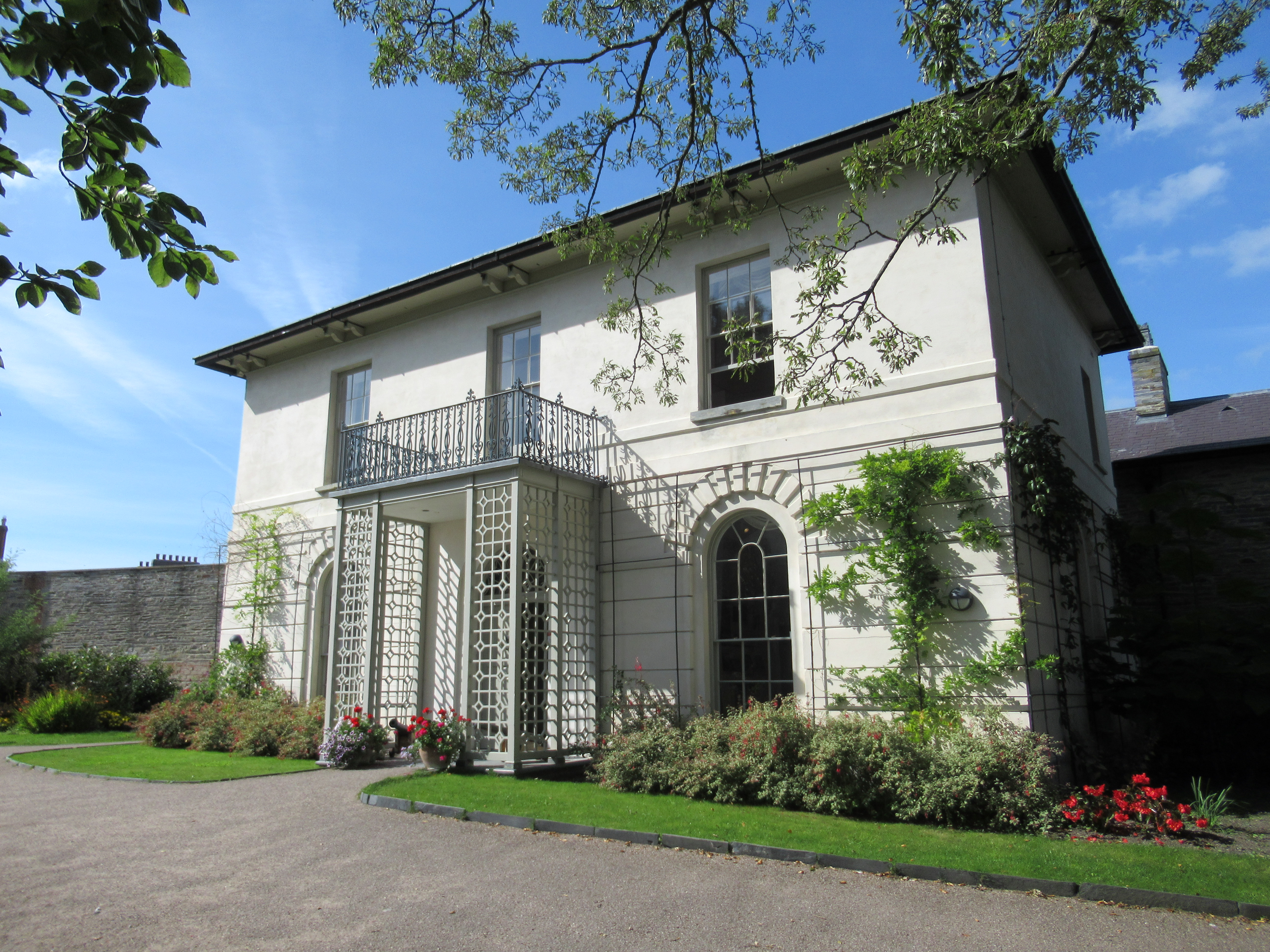
- Castle Green House after restoration

- Location within Wales

General information
- Type: House
- Architectural style: Regency
- Location: Cardigan Castle, Cardigan, Wales
- Completed: 1827
- Renovated: 2015 (completed)

Technical details
- Floor count: 2–3
- Lifts/elevators: 1

Design and construction
- Designations: Grade II* listed

Renovating team
- Renovating firm: Purcell

Castle Green House is a Grade II* listed house located in the grounds of Cardigan Castle, Cardigan, Ceredigion, Wales. It was restored in the 2000s and now acts as a museum, events centre and residential accommodation.

== History ==
The construction of a house in the castle grounds began in 1808 for John Bowen, partially using the foundations and a 13th-century round tower of the original Cardigan Castle. It was extended in 1827 by David Evans, for Arthur Jones, the High Sheriff of Cardiganshire.

The house became a Grade II* listed building in 1961.

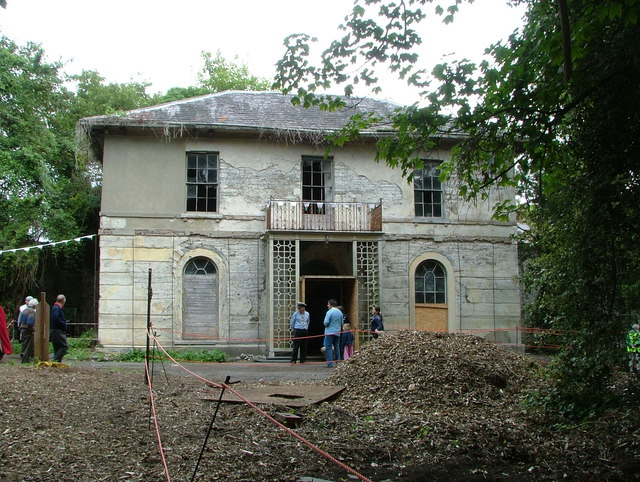
House in 2004 before restoration

In the 1940s Miss Barbara Wood and her mother moved into Castle Green House. They were unable to adequately maintain the property and it fell into disrepair. In 1984 it was declared unfit for human habitation and Miss Woods moved into a small caravan in front of the house. She refused to leave until ill health forced her to move to a nursing home in 1996. Miss Wood finally sold the castle and house to Ceredigion County Council in 2003 for £500,000.

The castle and house were restored led by the Cadwgan Building Preservation Trust, using £12 million of funding. It re-opened to the public in 2015. The main house became the location for displays about its occupants, the castle and the National Eisteddfod of Wales.

The building is also used for luxury guest accommodation.

== Description ==
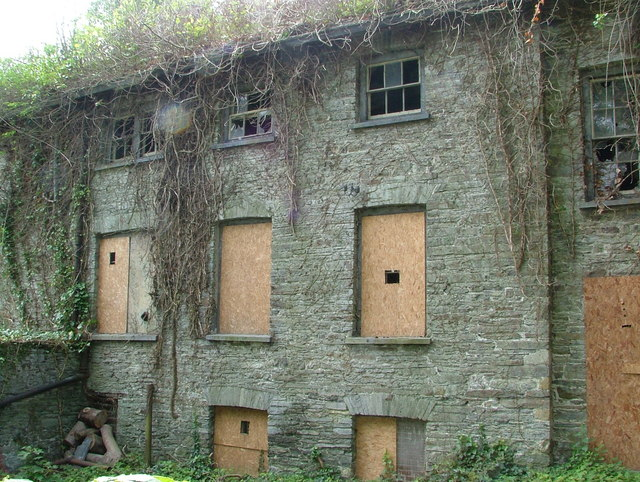
East Wing before restoration

The front range is a two-storey stucco fronted house with two arched windows either side of the main door and three 12-pane sash windows to the first floor. The front door has a large timber trellis porch.

The East Wing rear range is three storeys, stone faced, with a large round tower projecting to the rear. The bottom floor contained a dungeon, coal cellar and a large wash room, while the top floor included a library.
