= 1176 Cardigan eisteddfod =

1176 Welsh cultural event

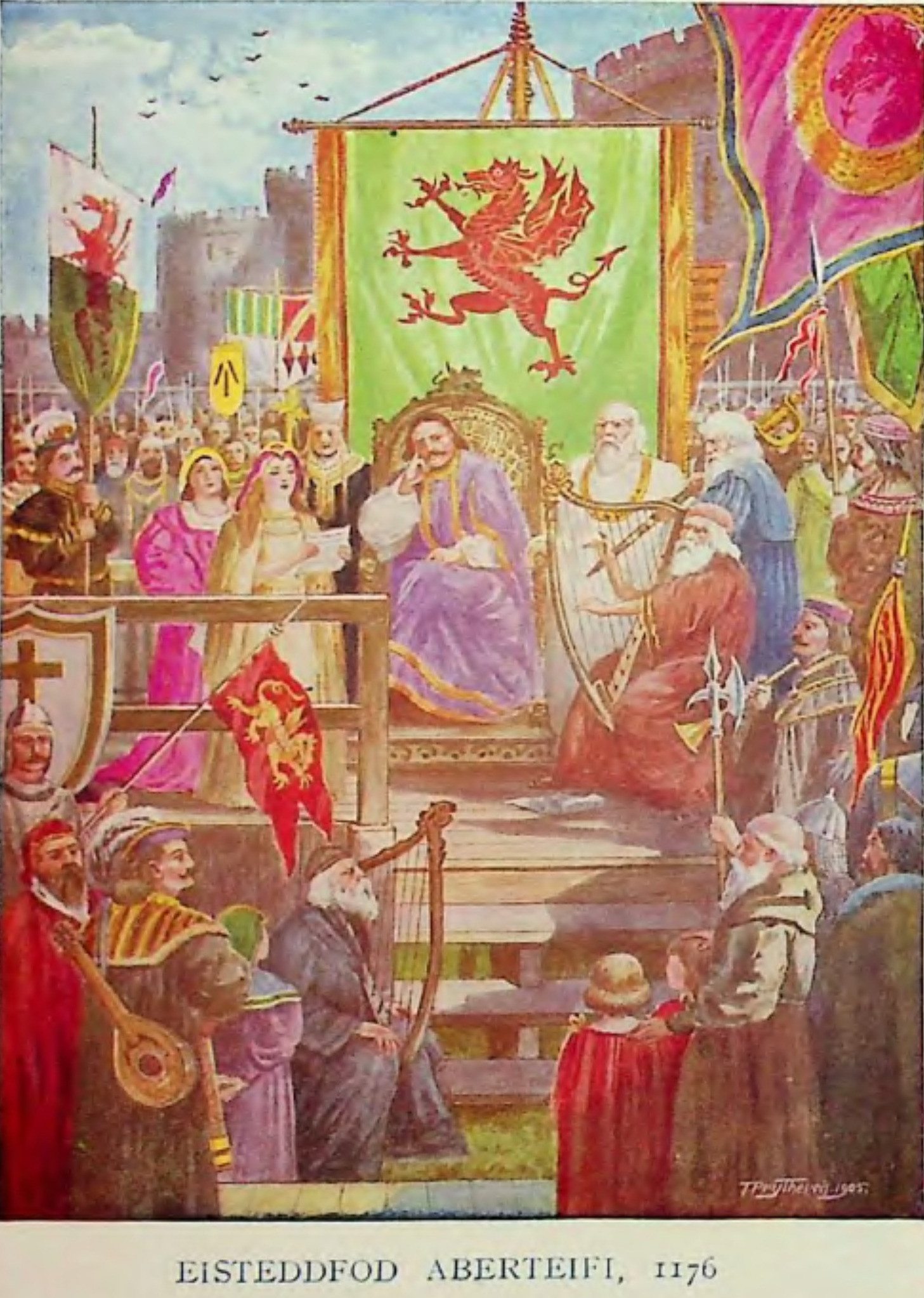
A depiction of the 1176 Eisteddfod in a 1930 schoolbook

The 1176 Cardigan eisteddfod, as it is commonly described today, was a cultural tournament involving bards and musicians, held in the grounds of Cardigan Castle, Cardigan, West Wales, by the Lord Rhys ap Gruffydd. Though the term eisteddfod was not commonly used until several centuries later, the 1176 gathering is commonly claimed to be the earliest recorded forerunner of the modern national eisteddfod event.

== Background ==
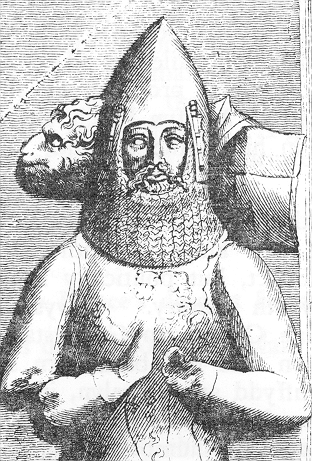
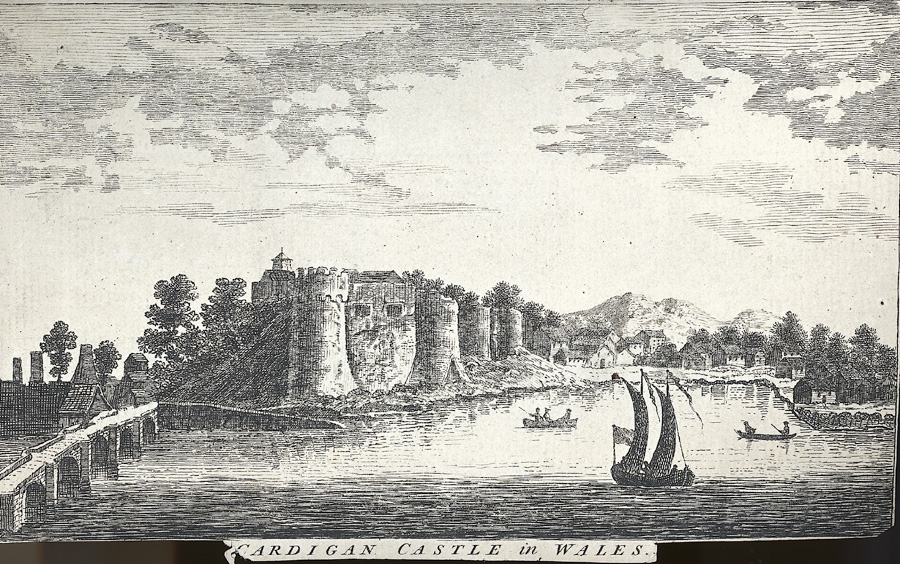
Rhys ap Gruffydd held the event at the grounds of Cardigan Castle

Rhys ap Gruffydd became the ruler uniting the whole of Deheubarth, covering southwest Wales, in 1155. This had followed years of battles with the English King Henry II. Rhys was made Lord of Ystrad Tywi or, commonly, the Lord Rhys. There followed a period of relative peace and security. In the early 1170s Henry II sought friendship with Rhys and confirmed his leadership of Deheubarth. In 1171 Rhys rebuilt Cardigan Castle in stone, as a political and military statement, making it his chief residence.

Welsh princes commonly patronised professional bards at the time, who in return wrote poetry praising their sponsors.

The gathering at Cardigan Castle in 1176 is recorded in the medieval chronicle Brut y Tywysogion. The next eisteddfod in Wales of any certainty took place circa 1451 in Carmarthen.

== Description ==
According to Brut y Tywysogion, Lord Rhys announced the event a year in advance, "throughout Wales, England, Scotland, Ireland and the other islands", which suggests the event was on an unprecedented scale. Participants came from as far away as Ireland and France. It was held at Cardigan Castle over Christmas of 1176. Cardigan Castle was newly restored in stone and, by holding a tournament here rather than at the traditional base of Deheubarth at Dinefwr, Lord Rhys was making a statement to the old Norman and Welsh rulers.

According to the 1770 'History of Wales' "a great feast" was held and "many hundreds of English, Normans, and others coming to Aberteifi [Cardigan], were very honourably received, and courteously entertained by Prince Rhys ...Rhys called all the bards or poets throughout all Wales to come thither ...the bards being seated, they were to answer each other in rhyme." Rhys awarded two chairs as prizes, one for the winner of the poetry competition and the other for music. The poetry chair went to a bard from Gwynedd, while the music prize went to the son of Eilon the Crythwr, a member of Rhys's court. Chairs were a valuable asset, normally reserved for people of high status.

It has been conjectured by historian Roger Turvey that the idea for a cultural festival of music and poetry at Cardigan may have originated from a similar festival in France known as The Puy. Rhys may have known about the tradition via his connections with the Norman French, or from soldiers returning from the continent.

When asked about Turvey's theory, eisteddfod historian Hywel Teifi Edwards said, "It's conjecture, but there's no doubt that there was a bardic tradition of competition for status before this time." Edwards further stated that any foreign influence was an indication of how very cosmopolitan Medieval Wales had been. "It's a sign of a healthy culture to accept – and marry with – other cultures," he added.

== Legacy ==
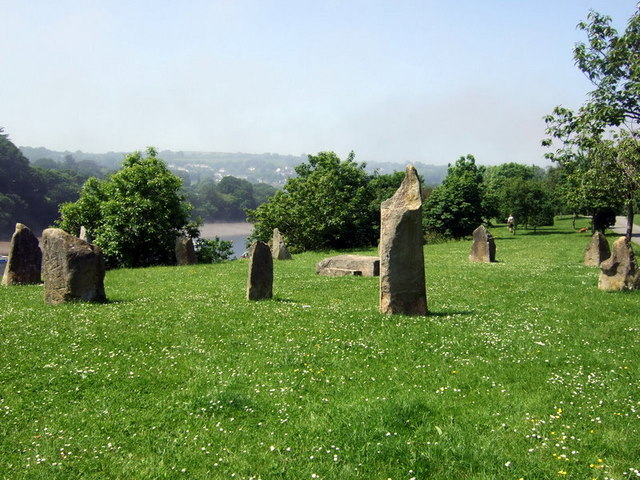
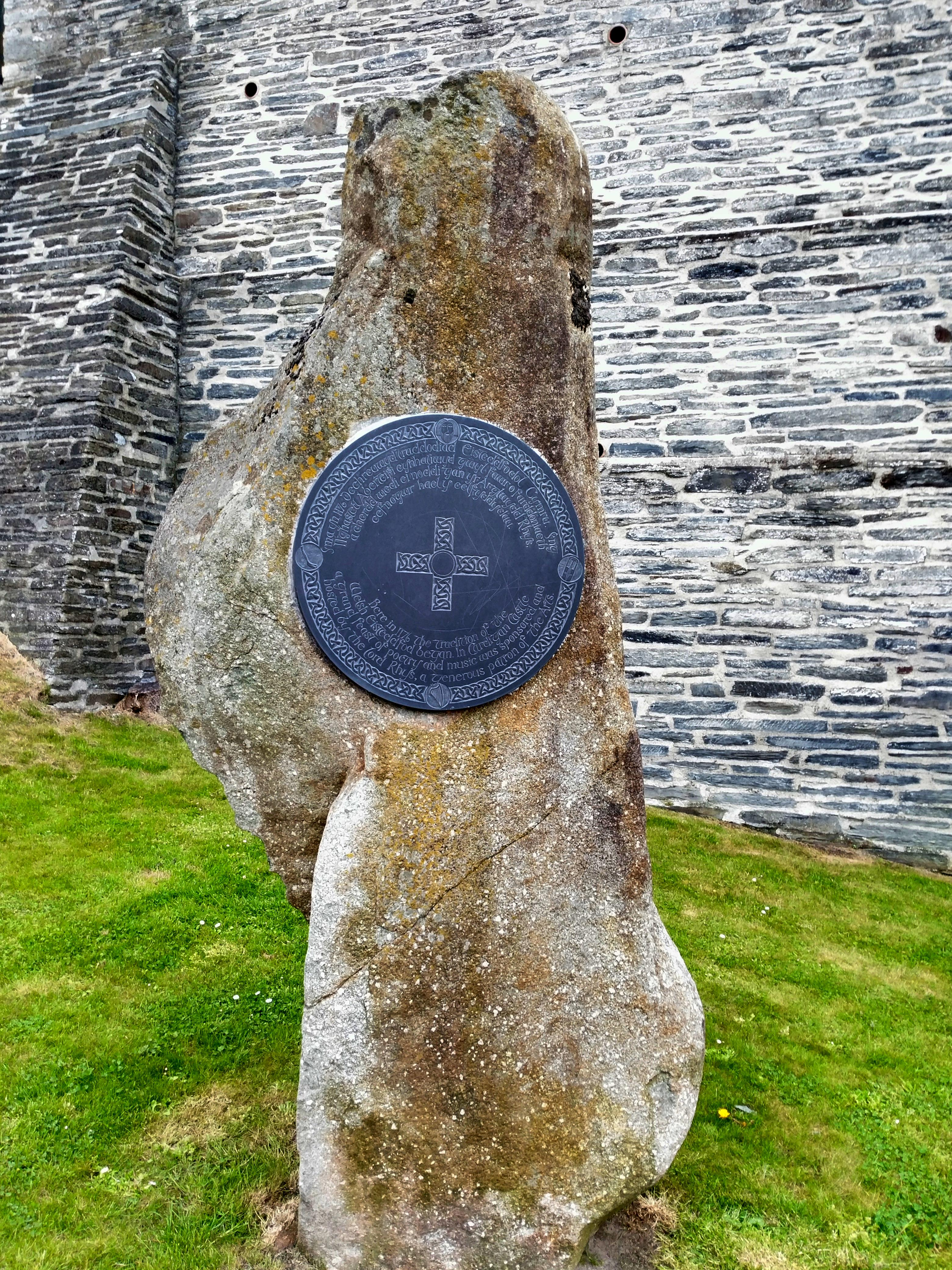
Gorsedd stones (left), erected in 1976 when the National Eisteddfod was held at Aberteifi to mark the 800th anniversary of the 1167 event and a stone plaque (right) erected near the castle

The next recorded eisteddfods were held in Carmarthen between 1451 and 1453, by the powerful nobleman of the area, Gruffudd ap Nicholas. He wanted to emulate the Lord Rhys and, probably as a bard himself, wanted to strengthen the bardic tradition. A 'Cadair Arian' (Silver Chair) was awarded as a prize, to a bard from Flintshire.

At the next recorded eisteddfods, in the 16th century, chairs were again awarded as prizes. The first chair made for the modern form of Eisteddfod was at the Carmarthen event of 1819. They became regular prizes after the National Eisteddfod was introduced in the 1860s.

In 2015 a 9-foot (2.7 m) high Eisteddfod chair was created and installed at the top of Cardigan Castle's East Tower, as a centrepiece of an exhibition about the Wales Eisteddfod. The chair incorporated interpretative details that would have been important to the Lord Rhys, including a carved lion's head and two bronze horses.

The modern restaurant at Cardigan Castle is named "1176" in reference to Lord Rhys's gathering.

A novel about the 1176 event, entitled Song Castle by Luke Waterson, was published in 2018. The book imagined what the festival and the journeys made by its participants were like.

In June 2026, to mark the 850th anniversary of the 1176 eisteddfod and the holding of the 2026 National Eisteddfod in the Cardigan area, a giant puppet of Lord Rhys paraded through Pembrokeshire. Carreg Filltir Las: Taith Yr Arglwydd Rhys ('Blue Milestone: Tour of Lord Rhys') also included a puppet of his dog, Teifi, and created site-specific ceremonies at each location. Starting in St Davids the tour was due to end at the Cardigan riverfront, 8 days later.
