= Cardigan Castle =

Castle in Ceredigion, Wales

- Cardigan, Wales
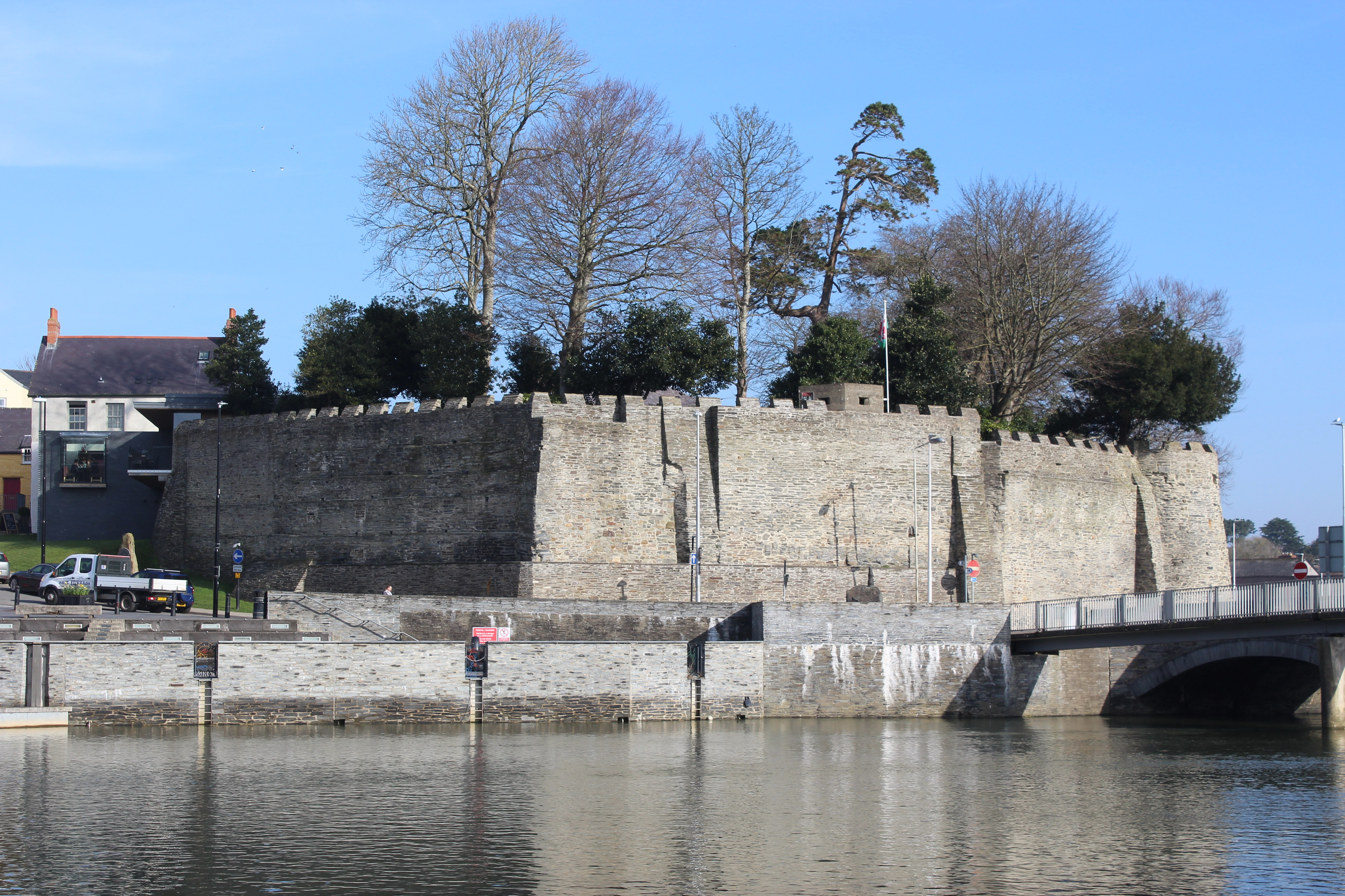
- Cardigan Castle

Site information
- Type: Motte and bailey
- Owner: Ceredigion County Council
- Open to the public: Yes
- Condition: Restored

Location
- Shown within Wales
- Location within Wales
- Coordinates: 52.0815°N 4.6605°W
- Grid reference: grid reference SN17704594

Site history
- Materials: Stone
- Events: Site of first Eisteddfod (1176)

Listed Building – Grade I

Cardigan Castle (Welsh: Castell Aberteifi) is a castle overlooking the River Teifi in Cardigan, Ceredigion, Wales. It is a Grade I listed building. The castle dates from the late 11th-century, though was rebuilt in 1244. Castle Green House was built inside the castle walls in the early 1800s. After falling into disrepair the castle was restored in the early 2000s and opened to the public in 2015. It is owned by Ceredigion County Council and now includes a heritage centre and open-air concert facilities. The castle's gardens are listed on the Cadw/ICOMOS Register of Parks and Gardens of Special Historic Interest in Wales.

== History ==
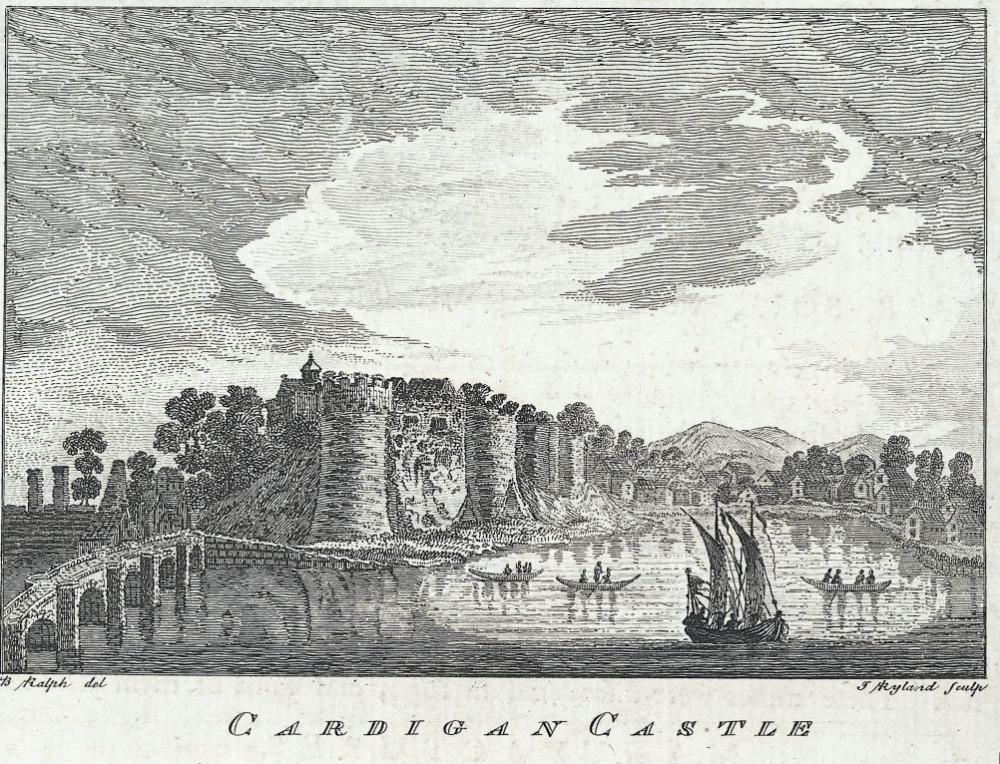
Cardigan Castle, c. 1763–1770

The first motte-and-bailey castle (ca.1093) was built a mile away from the present site, probably about the time of the founding of the town by Roger de Montgomery, a Norman baron.

In 1110, King Henry I of England took Cardigan from Prince Owain ap Cadwgan as a punishment, and gave the Lordship of Cardigan and the castle to Gilbert Fitz Richard. The forerunner of the present castle was built by Gilbert Lord of Clare after the former was destroyed.

The castle was handed down to Gilbert's son, Gilbert de Clare, 1st Earl of Pembroke in 1136. The same year, Owain Gwynedd led the defeat of the Norman rulers in the town of Cardigan at the Battle of Crug Mawr. The town was taken and burnt, though the castle was successfully defended by Normans commanded by Robert fitz Martin.

The castle was later recaptured by the Normans, and was held for Earl Roger of Hertford. In 1166 it was captured by Rhys ap Gruffydd, who rebuilt it in stone in 1171. In 1176 the first recorded eisteddfod was held at the castle.

After Rhys's death in 1197 his sons, Maelgwn and Gruffydd, disputed their inheritance resulting in Maelgwn surrendering Gruffydd to the Normans and selling the castle to King John. The castle was later held for William Marshall.

Llywelyn the Great captured it in 1215 and at the parliament held at Aberdyfi in 1216 made it over to the sons of Gruffydd ap Rhys of Deheubarth, but in 1223 William Marshall the Younger recaptured it. In 1231 the castle was again captured for Llywelyn by Rhys Gryg and his allies. Llywelyn held it until his death in 1240. On Llywelyn's death it fell back into Norman hands, and in 1244 Earl Gilbert of Pembroke rebuilt it with town walls for added protection. It is the remains of this building that still stands overlooking the river.

It was badly damaged during the English Civil War in Wales and until the 18th century it was only used as a prison.

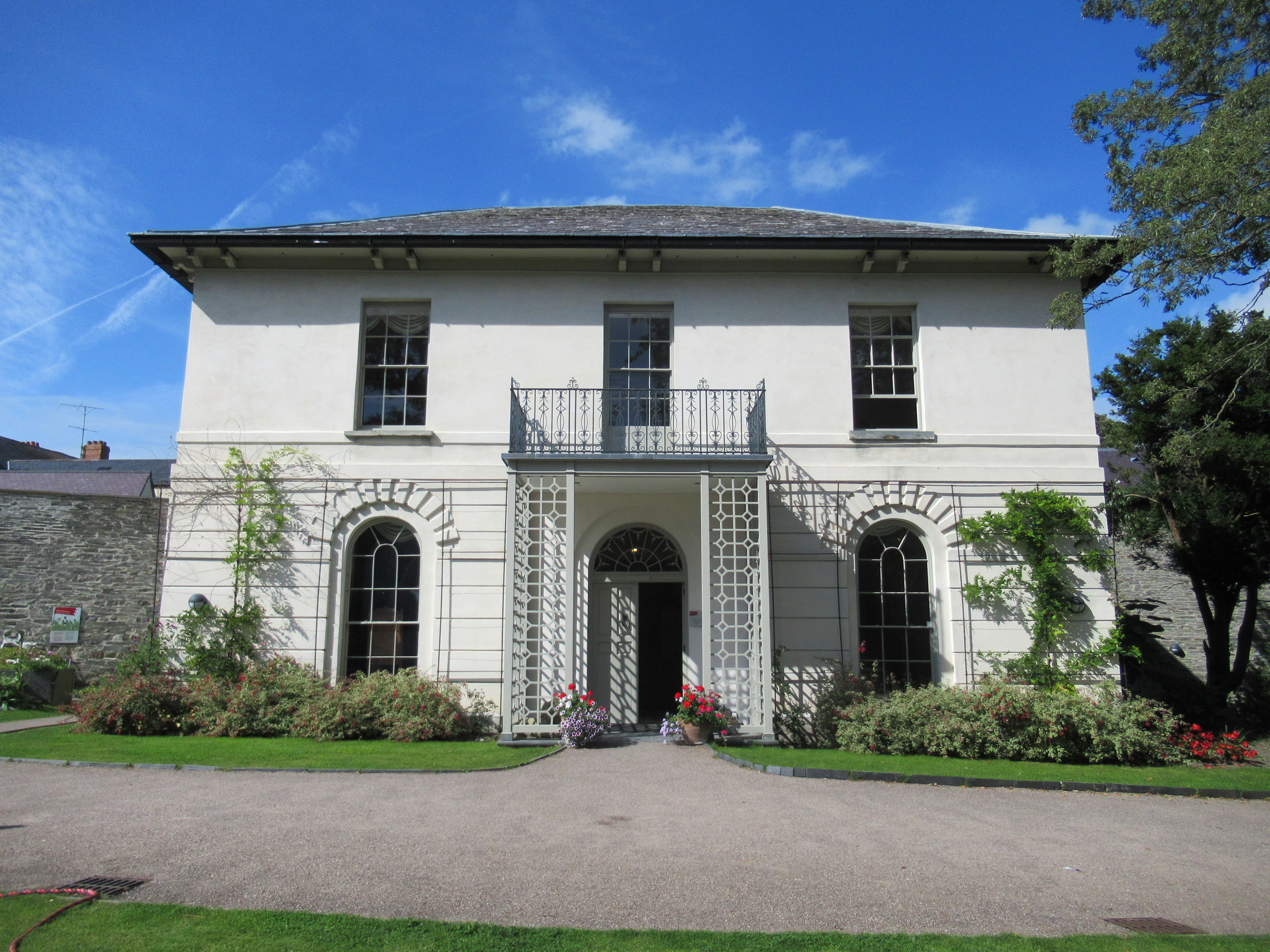
Castle Green House

Sometime between 1805 and 1808 the castle owner, John Bowen, arranged the construction of Castle Green House within the castle walls. The front range was added in 1827.

In 1940 the castle and house was bought by a shipping magnate His daughter, Barbara Wood, and her mother moved into Castle Green House but this slowly fell into disrepair and was allowed to decay further by the owner to the extent that the outer castle walls needed supporting. Miss Wood continued to occupy the castle for almost 60 years, despite attempts by the local authority to take over the castle in 1971 and Castle Green House being declared unfit for human habitation in 1984.

== 21st century ==
Miss Wood, the castle's last occupant, finally left the castle in 1996 to be cared for in a nursing home. Faced with six years of nursing costs, she put the castle up for private sale in 2001. The castle was purchased by Ceredigion County Council in April 2003 and repairs began as part of the regeneration of Cardigan. In 2004 Castle Green House appeared on the BBC's second series of Restoration, presented by Griff Rhys Jones.

Renovation work continued for some years after its purchase by the Council, and the castle was opened to the public on 15 April 2015 with a concert held in July 2015. The new facilities include bed-and-breakfast and self-catering accommodation, a heritage centre with education facilities, a restaurant (named "1176" in reference to Lord Rhys's eisteddfod in that year), an events and open-air concert area, and rooms for hire for classes. The castle's grounds, set within the ward and including pleasure gardens and a kitchen garden, are designated Grade II on the Cadw/ICOMOS Register of Parks and Gardens of Special Historic Interest in Wales.

== See also ==
- 1176 Cardigan eisteddfod
- Castles in Great Britain and Ireland
- List of castles in Wales
- List of Scheduled Roman to modern Monuments in Ceredigion
