= Gruffudd ap Rhys ap Gruffudd =

Welsh prince (died 1201)

Gruffudd ap Rhys ap Gruffudd or Gruffudd ab yr Arglwydd Rhys (died 25 July 1201) was a prince of Deheubarth in south-west Wales.

== Lineage ==
He was the son of Rhys ap Gruffudd (The Lord Rhys) and grandson of Gruffudd ap Rhys. Gruffudd was the eldest son of Rhys ap Gruffudd by his wife Gwenllian, daughter of Madog ap Maredudd prince of Powys. Rhys intended Gruffudd to be his main heir, and in 1189 he married Maud de Braose, the daughter of Maud de St Valery and of William de Braose. They had two sons, Rhys and Owain.

== Family feud ==
In Rhys' last years a feud developed between Gruffudd and his brother Maelgwn ap Rhys, both supported by some of their other brothers. In 1189 Rhys was persuaded to imprison Maelgwn, and he was given into Gruffudd's keeping at Dinefwr. Gruffudd handed him over to his father in law, William de Braose. In 1192 Rhys secured Maelgwn's release, but by now he and Gruffudd were bitter enemies. In 1194 Maelgwn and another brother Hywel defeated their father and imprisoned him, though he was later released by Hywel.

Rhys ap Gruffudd died in 1197. Gruffudd was recognised as his successor after an interview with Archbishop Hubert the justiciar. But Maelgwn used troops supplied by Gwenwynwyn ab Owain of Powys to attack Aberystwyth. He captured the town and the castle, and took Gruffudd himself prisoner, later handing him over to Gwenwynwyn who in turn transferred him to the English who imprisoned him in Corfe Castle.

In 1198 Gwenwynwyn threatened the English holdings at Painscastle and Elfael, and Gruffudd was released from captivity to try to mediate in the dispute. His efforts failed, and in the ensuing battle Gwenwynwyn was defeated.

Gruffudd retained his liberty and by the end of the year had captured all of Ceredigion from Maelgwn except for the castles of Cardigan and Ystrad Meurig. In 1199 he took Cilgerran Castle. Maelgwn made an agreement with King John of England, selling Cardigan castle to him in exchange for the possession of the remainder of Ceredigion.

In July 1201 another brother, Maredudd ap Rhys, was killed, and Gruffudd took over his lands.

== Death and burial ==
On 25 July 1201 Gruffudd himself died of an illness and was buried in Strata Florida Abbey.

Preceded by Rhys ap Gruffudd	Prince of Deheubarth; 1197–1201	Succeeded by Maelgwn ap Rhys
