= Maelgwn ap Rhys =

Prince of part of the kingdom of Deheubarth

Maelgwn ap Rhys (c. 1170–1230) was prince of part of the kingdom of Deheubarth in south west Wales.

Maelgwn was the son of Rhys ap Gruffydd (The Lord Rhys) by his wife Gwenllian ferch Madog, daughter of Madog ap Maredudd prince of Powys. He appears in the historical record for the first time helping at the siege of Tenby in 1187. In 1188 when Baldwin, Archbishop of Canterbury and Giraldus Cambrensis travelled through Wales raising men for the Third Crusade, They spoke with Maelgwn and his two brothers, and Maelgwn agreed to accompany the group to the king's court and follow his advice on taking the cross.

Maelgwn was described as being short in stature and a turbulent character, who caused his father much trouble in his later years and maintained a lengthy feud with his brother Gruffydd. He was kept a prisoner from 1189 to 1192. In 1194 he and his brother Hywel defeated their father in battle and imprisoned him in Nevern castle, though he was later released by Hywel. Maelgwn was in exile when Rhys died in 1197. Gruffydd had been recognised as his father's successor, but Maelgwn, helped by troops supplied by Gwenwynwyn ab Owain of Powys attacked and captured the town and castle of Aberystwyth, taking Gruffydd prisoner. Maelgwn handed Gruffydd over to Gwenwynwyn and took possession of Ceredigion. When Gwenwynwyn was defeated at Painscastle by Norman forces in 1198 Gruffydd was set free and recaptured all Ceredigion from Maelgwn except for the castles of Cardigan and Ystrad Meurig. Maelgwn came to an agreement with King John of England and sold Cardigan castle to John, taking possession of the remainder of Ceredigion himself. The annalist of Brut y Tywysogion commented:

In that year, about the Feast of St. Mary Magdalen, Maelgwn ap Rhys, for fear and hatred of his brother Gruffydd, sold to the English for little profit the key and keeping of all Wales, the castle of Aber Teifi [Cardigan]

Gruffydd died in 1201, enabling Maelgwn to seize Cilgerran Castle, but in 1204 he lost it to William Marshall. In 1204 Maelgwn's men attacked his brother Hywel, leaving him with wounds of which he later died. In 1205 according to Brut y Tywysogion, Maelgwn caused a certain Irishman to kill Cedifor ap Gruffudd and his four sons with a battle-axe after they had been captured. The chronicler of Brut y Tywysogion again disapproved, describing Cedifor as "a praiseworthy man, gracious, strong and generous".

In 1207 Maelgwn's ally, Gwenwynwyn of Powys fell out with King John and his lands were taken into the custody of the crown. Llywelyn the Great of Gwynedd took advantage of this to annex the northern part of Ceredigion from Maelgwn and to give the lands between the River Ystwyth and the River Aeron to the sons of Gruffydd. Maelgwn helped King John to force Llywelyn to come to terms in 1211 but these lands were not returned to him, and this induced him to throw in his lot with Llywelyn instead of the king. However, when Llywelyn held a parliament at Aberdyfi in 1216, at which he redistributed the lands formerly under the rule of the Lord Rhys, Maelgwn was still only allowed the southern part of Ceredigion.

Maelgwn died in 1230 in Llannerch Aeron and was buried at Strata Florida Abbey. His territory passed to his son, Maelgwn ap Maelgwn, called Maelgwn Fychan. In the late 1230s, the latter agreed a treaty with Gilbert Marshal, 4th Earl of Pembroke, whereby Maelgwn Fychan's son, Rhys, would marry Gilbert's illegitimate daughter, Isabel, and receive the cantref of Is-Aeron, except the commote of Is-Hirwen (which contained Cardigan Castle), as dowry; in return Maelgwn Fychan and Rhys would become vassals of Gilbert (so far as it didn't compromise fealty to the king).
