= Whitland Abbey =

Former cistercian abbey in West Wales

Coordinates: 51.83367°N 4.60189°W

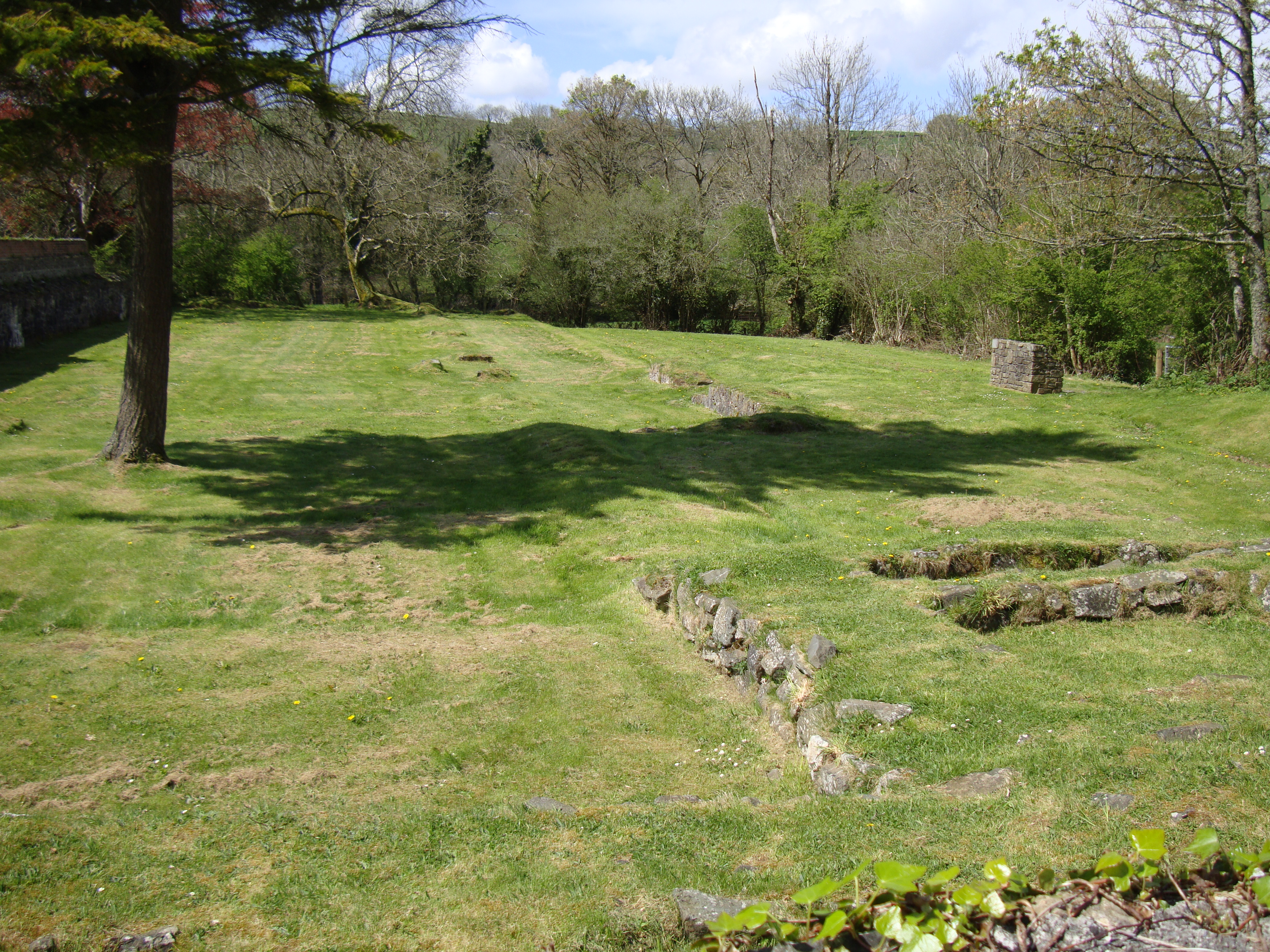
The remains of Whitland Abbey

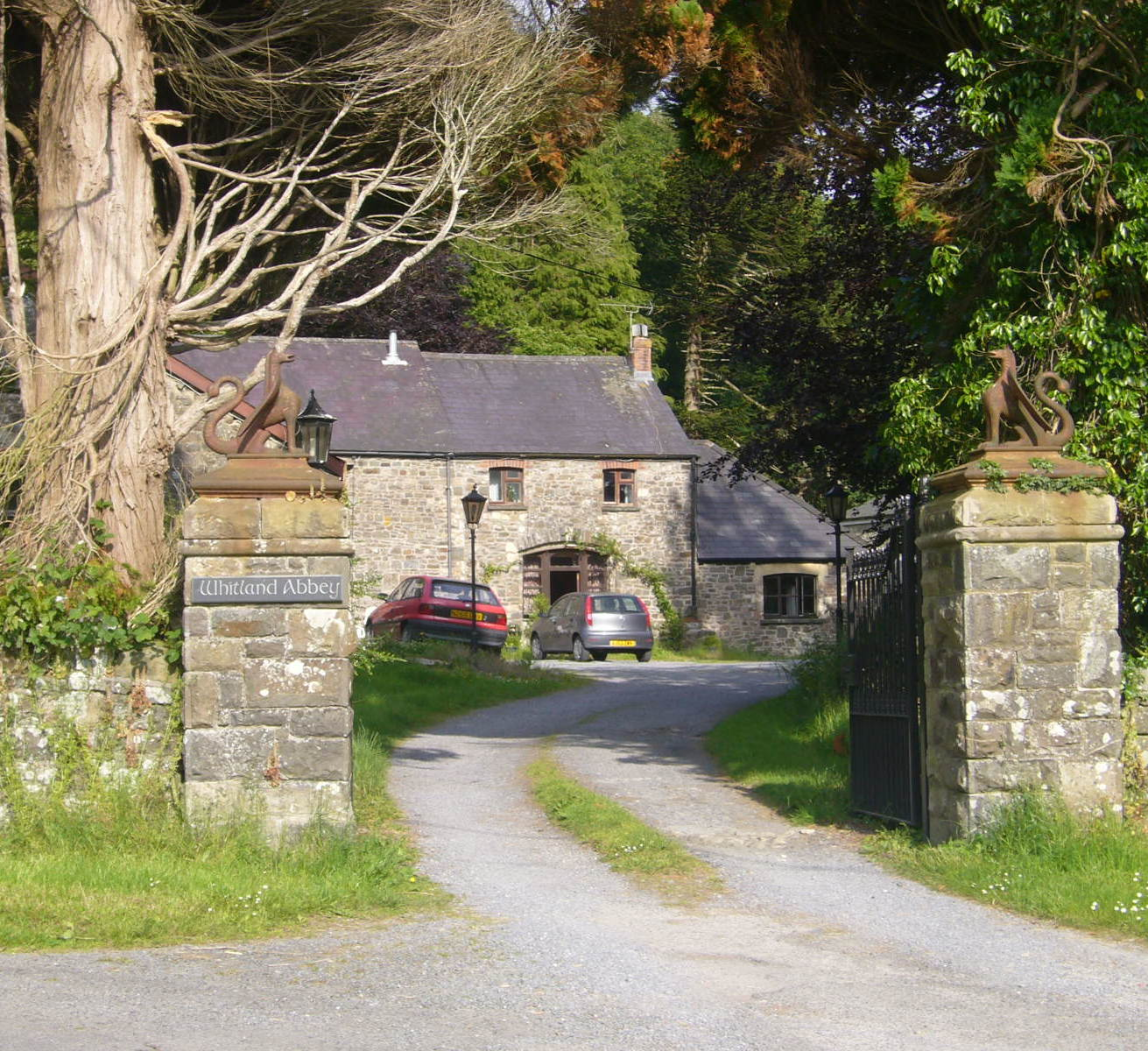
Whitland Abbey

Whitland Abbey (Welsh: Abaty Hendy-gwyn ar Daf or simply Y Tŷ Gwyn ar Daf; Latin: Albalanda) was a country house and Cistercian abbey in the parish of Llangan, in what was the hundred of Narberth, Pembrokeshire, Wales. The town which grew up nearby is now named Whitland after it. It was widely known as Ty Gwyn ar Daf, meaning White House on the Taf, in reference to the country house originally built here before it became a monastic settlement which was known under that name. It is most associated with being the place where Hywel Dda drew up his laws around 940. It functioned as a Cistercian monastery between the 12th and 16th centuries.

== History ==
=== The house of Ty Gwyn ar Daf ===
Ty Gwyn ar Daf was once the occasional residence of Hywel Dda in the 10th century and a grand national council was held here around the year 940. The council had the purpose of compiling and enacting the code of laws, which are still known as "the Laws of Hywel Dda." Hywel's laws were deposited at Dinefwr Castle later in the tenth century after being drawn up at Ty Gwyn. In order to give greater solemnity to this convocation, and to implore the divine wisdom to assist their counsels, the king remained here with his whole court during Lent, in the constant exercise of prayer and other acts of devotion.

=== Whitland Abbey ===
After the destruction of the monastery of Bangor-on-Dee (Welsh: Bangor-is-y-Coed or Bangor Is-Coed) in North Wales, following the 613 Battle of Chester, a religious society was settled at this place under the auspices of Paulinas, son of Urien Rheged, a disciple of St Germanus, in which originated the abbey of Albalanda, or Whitland, afterwards erected near the site, and called by the Welsh, after the name of the former establishment, Ty Gwyn ar Taf. However, this Abbey is now known not to have been founded in Whitland at all.

Whitland was founded on 16 September 1140 by monks from the mother house of Clairvaux Abbey. In 1144 it was located at Little Trefgarn, near Haverfordwest. It moved to Whitland in about 1155, a site having been granted by John of Torrington. The abbey founded a number of daughter houses in Wales, starting with an abortive foundation at Abbeycwmhir in 1143. In 1164 a group of monks from Whitland founded Strata Florida Abbey. Strata Marcella Abbey was founded from Whitland in 1170, and in 1176 Cwmhir Abbey was re-founded.

Whitland Abbey was originally a Cambro-Norman foundation, but soon came under the control and patronage of Rhys ap Gruffudd, Prince of Deheubarth. It is related in the Welsh annals that Cadwaladr, brother of Owain Gwynedd, Prince of North Wales, during the disputes which arose between him and his nephews, the sons of Owain, entrusted the custody of his newly erected Cynvael Castle to the abbot of Ty Gwyn ar Taf, who defended it with obstinate valour against the assaults of the young princes by whom it was besieged. After a determined resistance, protracted till the walls of the castle were beaten down, and the whole of the garrison either slain or wounded, the abbot effected his escape from the ruins, through the assistance of some friends in the camp of the enemy, and retired into his monastery.

It was at Whitland that Rhys's son, Maredudd, ended his days as a monk after he had been blinded by the order of King Henry II of England when a hostage in England. It became an important cultural centre for south-west Wales and a strong supporter of the Welsh struggle to remain free of English domination. The monastery, which was dedicated to St Mary, and had an establishment of eight monks, continued to flourish till the dissolution, at which time its revenue was estimated at £153. 17. 2.; and its site was granted, in the 36th of Henry VIII, to Henry Audley and John Cordel.

A forge was later established on the site, reputed to be the oldest in Carmarthenshire. This and the Victorian house built on the site came into the possession of the Yelverton family when William Henry Yelverton married the heiress of John Morgan, the previous owner. It later passed by marriage to the Blake family, who were given royal permission to adopt the additional name of Yelverton. When Major Anthony Blake, DSO MC Royal Ulster Rifles was killed in Korea in 1951 his widow sold the estate to a Mr. Legge after which the estate was sold piecemeal to local farmers.

Of the royal palace of Ty Gwyn, which was comparatively a small building, designed chiefly for a hunting seat, no vestiges are discernible, only the grass-covered foundations of the walls.
