= Cantref Mawr =

Welsh medieval cantref

Cantref Mawr was a cantref in southwest Wales. It was of strategic importance in medieval Wales as the location of the main seat of the princes of Deheubarth at Dinefwr.

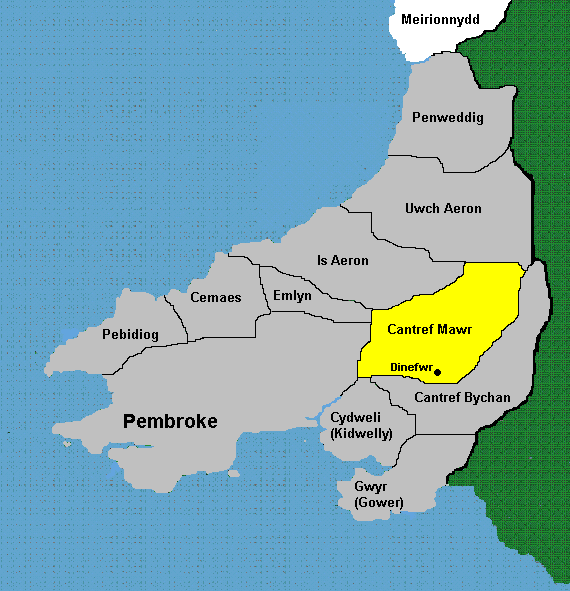
As the only part of the kingdom of Deheubarth to present natural obstacles to an invading army, Cantref Mawr was of great strategic importance

Cantref Mawr means "The Great Cantref". Each cantref in medieval Wales was divided into cwmwdau, and a typical cantref would be made up of two or three cwmwd. Cantref Mawr was made up of seven cwmwdau, which made it one of the largest cantrefs in Wales. Cantref Mawr was an upland area, bounded by the rivers Tywi, Teifi and Gwili. The area at this period was covered in dense scrub which caused difficulties for invading armies, so that the Cantref Mawr often provided a secure refuge for the princes of Deheubarth when facing an invasion.
