= Lleision (dynasty) =

Welsh dynastic family

Lleision Middle Welsh: LleisyaỼn
- Arms of the lords of Southern Powys, later used by John Charlton, baron of Powys to claim a continuation with this dynasty
- Country: Kingdom of Powys; Northern Powys; Southern Powys
- Founder: Lles Llawddeog (legendary)
- Final ruler: Llywelyn ap Madog
- Final head: Owain Glyndŵr
- Deposition: c. 1416; 610 years ago

The dynasty of the Lleision (Welsh pronunciation: ['ɬei̯sjɔn], 'descendants of Lles Llawddeog' (Note: Lles Llawddeog is a figure who is otherwise wholly unknown save for his place in the genealogies of this family and references to him as the ancestral patriarch of this dynasty. His byname may mean 'burning hand' or 'ruling hand', but what he ruled over is unknown.)), sometimes known as the House of Powys or House of Mathrafal, was an important Welsh family in the high Middle Ages in Wales. It came to prominence with the brothers Bleddyn and Rhiwallon ap Cynfyn, uterine brothers of the only man to rule over all Wales, Gruffudd ap Llywelyn. The pair were elevated to rule over the northern half of Gruffudd's former kingdom by Harold and Tostig Godwinson, who intervened in Wales after the killing of Gruffudd by Cynan ab Iago in 1063. After some decades of intense internecine violence and struggle with Gruffudd ap Cynan which forced the family out of Gwynedd, the dynasty was reduced to Maredudd ap Bleddyn, who controlled much of the former Kingdom of Powys, which had been absorbed about 900 AD by the sons of Rhodri Mawr.

Maredudd reestablished the Kingdom of Powys, and left it intact to his heir Madog ap Maredudd, in whose reign the dynasty saw its apogee. Madog was an astute politician, and balanced internal politics with an accommodating position towards the Empress Matilda's camp in the Anarchy and subsequently enjoyed a close relationship with Henry II of England. He was also a great patron of the arts and the Church. However, following Madog's death in 1160, his son and heir Llywelyn was killed, and the dynasty and kingdom of Powys disintegrated owing to renewed internecine violence. Despite Powys' fracturing, various members of the family such as Owain Cyfeiliog and Gwenwynwyn ab Owain were major political figures in Welsh politics until the rise of Llywelyn ab Iorwerth in 1215. However, this dynasty was the only family of royal descent in Wales to survive the Edwardian conquest of Wales largely intact, and one branch of it saw its holdings in southern Powys transformed into the Marcher lordship of Powys. However, royal intervention on the part of Edward II saw the lordship transferred to an Englishman, as Edward married the heiress of this dynasty under English law, Hawys Gadarn, to his supporter John Charlton, 1st Baron Charlton. Other branches of the family survived the Conquest, most notably that of northern Powys. This branch would ultimately produce Owain Glyndŵr, the famed rebel and last native Welshman to claim the title of Prince of Wales by virtue of his descent from this dynasty and the dynasty of Deheubarth.

== History ==
The Lleision were effectively set up in Wales in the wake of the Anglo-Saxon King, Harold Godwinson, and his brother, Tostig Godwinson, Earl of Northumbria, and their disastrous raids of 1062–1063 against the King of Wales, Gruffydd ap Llywelyn. They installed his half-brother Bleddyn ap Cynfyn as King over Gwynedd.

From this point forward, his family jockeyed with the Royal House of Dinefwr and the Royal House of Aberffraw for the control of Wales. (The unrelated dynasty in the Kingdom of Gwent and the Kingdom of Morgannwg was swiftly overrun by the Marcher Lords after the Norman Conquest).

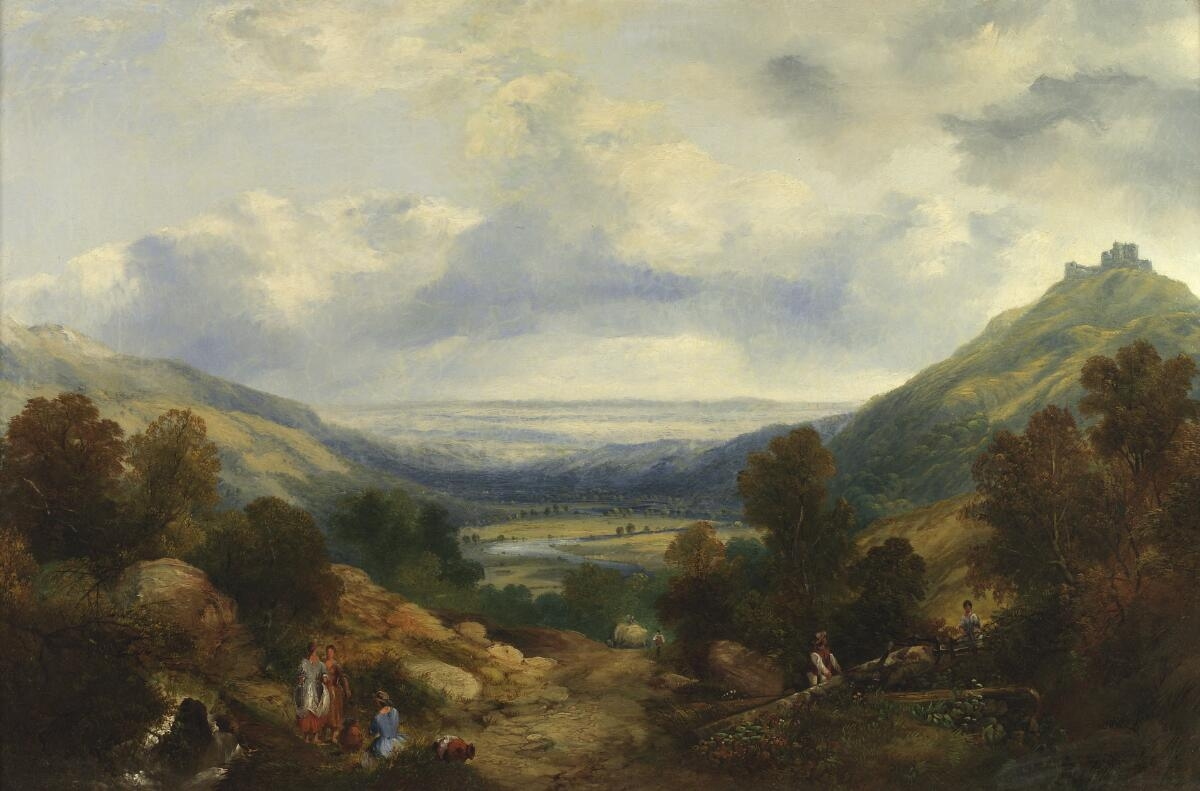
Painting of Castell Dinas Bran, ancestral seat of the Princes of Powys Fadog, in Llangollen, Denbighshire

The Lleision's influence was greatest between 1063 and 1081, until they lost control of Gwynedd to a resurgent Second Dynasty of Gwynedd. By 1191, the Kingdom of Powys was divided between the Principality of Powys Fadog in the north and the Principality of Powys Wenwynwyn (roughly modern Montgomeryshire) in the south. The first became a more-or-less loyal vassal of Gwynedd; the latter, one of its main competitors.

Thereafter, they avoided his campaign of extermination against the Welsh Royal Houses and even exchanged their claims to royalty for an English Lordship at the Parliament of Shrewsbury in 1283. They were displaced by the Lords of Mortimers in the early 14th century, until a momentary reascension of the House during the 15th century, following the Welsh Revolt led by the Prince of Wales, Owain Glyndŵr, against Prince Henry and King Henry IV of England, of the Royal House of Lancaster. Glyndwr combined the claims of the Lleision and Cadelling, with links to the Second Dynasty of Gwynedd.

=== Welsh Revolt ===
The rebellions were supported by the French Royal House of Valois, and were an attempt not only at gaining the independence of Wales, but also the redivision of England to their relatives, the House of Percy and the Mortimers. Despite being crowned as Prince of Wales in 1404, they eventually lost the war to the English forces of Henry IV and Henry V.

Nonetheless, their efforts didn't go in vain, as their rebellion gave rise to the first Welsh Kings of England, the Royal House of Tudor. The Tudors were their cousins on their mother's side, through the Tudors of Penmynydd, who fought with them during the rebellions, such a Sir Owen Tudor, the second husband of Queen Catherine of France. Glyndŵr was also the wealthiest Welshman in Wales before his downfall in 1415, and captured number of Longshanks's main castles such as Conwy, Harlech and Beaumaris, and besieged Caernarfon.

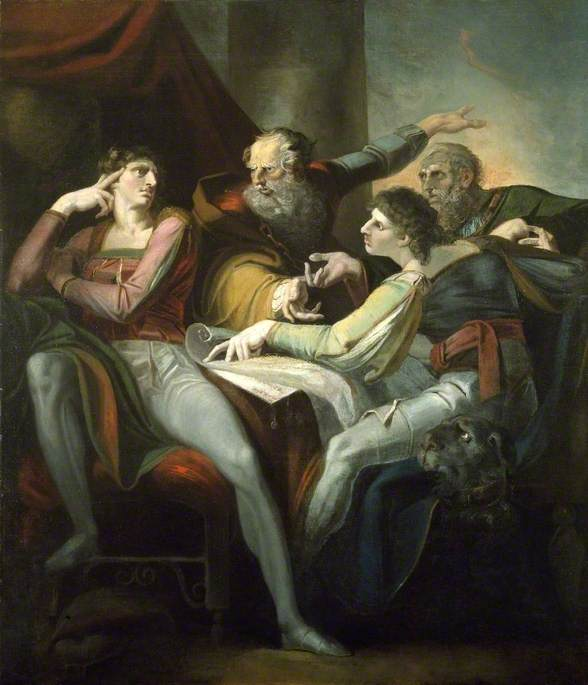
Painting of Shakespeare's play Henry IV: featuring Owen Glendower with members of his family ; Hotspur and Mortimer

This historic period would later be immortalized by William Shakespeare in his play Henry IV, Part 1 and Part 2, featuring "Owen Glendower" as a character. The plays depict the wars between his family and Prince Hal, future Henry V, and other historical events. Other characters featured include his daughter, Lady Mortimer, his son-in-law, Sir Edmund Mortimer, and in-laws Henry Hotspur Percy and Lady Percy. The plays were succeeded by "Henry V'" and are part of Shakespeare's Henriad.

== Members ==
Members of the Mathrafal Dynasty include:

- Bleddyn ap Cynfyn, King of Powys and Gwynedd, joined the Anglo-Saxon resistance with King Harold Godwinson, of the Royal House of Godwin, against William the Conqueror
- Gruffydd ap Llywelyn, King of Wales, son-in-law of Ælfgar, Earl of Mercia, Lady Godiva's son, made an agreement with King Edward the Confessor, of the Royal House of Wessex, his widow remarried the last Anglo-Saxon king Harold Godwinson, who died at Hastings fighting against William the Conqueror
- Rhiwallon ap Cynfyn, King of Powys and Gwynedd, his daughter married the King of Deheubarth, Rhys ap Tewdwr, of the Royal House of Dinefwr, was half-brother of the King of Wales Gruffydd ap Llywelyn
- Trahaearn ap Caradog, King of Gwynedd, fought against the King of the Welsh, Gruffudd ap Cynan, of the Royal House of Aberffraw, and the Norman Lord Robert of Rhuddlan
- Rhiryd ap Bleddyn, King of Powys, killed at war by the King of South Wales, Rhys ap Tewdwr, of the Royal House of Dinefwr, his father King Bleddyn ap Cynfyn was the founder of Mathrafal
- Cadwgan ap Bleddyn, Prince of Powys, married to a member of the House of De Say, companions of William the Conqueror, was an ally of King Gruffudd ap Cynan against the Montgomeries, Norman magnates
- Owain ap Cadwgan, Prince of Powys, he and his father lost lands to King Henry I of England, was known for his abduction of Princess Nest, wife of Gerald de Windsor, of the House of FitzGerald
- Iorwerth ap Bleddyn, Prince of Powys, joined the rebellions of Robert of Bellême, 3rd Earl of Shrewsbury, of the House of Bellême, then betrayed him with Lord William Pantulf
- Maredudd ap Bleddyn, Prince, later King of Powys, made peace with King Henry I of England, of the Royal House of Normandy, is featured in Brut y Tywysogion and retired to Snowdonia
- Gruffydd Fychan ap Iorwerth, Marcher Lord, Knight of Rhodes and Knight of the Order of Saint John of Jerusalem, fought in the Crusades under the Knights Hospitaller, rivals of the Knights Templar, his military order was under the protection of Frederick Barbarossa, Holy Roman Emperor
- Gwladys ferch Rhiwallon, Queen of Deheubarth, and mother of Princess Nesta, who had a son with King Henry I of England, son of William the Conqueror
