= Bleddyn =

Bleddyn is a masculine, Welsh given name.

Other spellings of Bleddyn are: Blevin, Blevyn, Blethyn, Blethin, Blevins, Blethins, Blethyns, Plethyn, Plethin, Pleddyn, Plethin and many others. People with the name include:

- Bleddyn ap Cynfyn (died 1075), prince of the Welsh Kingdoms of Gwynedd and of Powys
- Bleddyn Bowen (born 1961), Welsh rugby player
- Bleddyn Fardd (1258–1284), Welsh-language court poet from Gwynedd
- Bleddyn Taylor (born 1959), Welsh rugby player
- Bleddyn Williams (1923–2009), Welsh rugby player
- Cadwgan ap Bleddyn (1051–1111), prince of Powys in eastern Wales
- Iorwerth ap Bleddyn (1053–1111), prince of Powys in eastern Wales
- Maredudd ap Bleddyn (1047–1132), prince of Powys in eastern Wales
- Rhiryd ap Bleddyn (1049–1088), Welsh king of Powys
