= 1111 =

Calendar year

1111 in various calendars
- Gregorian calendar: 1111; MCXI
- Ab urbe condita: 1864
- Armenian calendar: 560; ԹՎ ՇԿ
- Assyrian calendar: 5861
- Balinese saka calendar: 1032–1033
- Bengali calendar: 517–518
- Berber calendar: 2061
- English Regnal year: 11 Hen. 1 – 12 Hen. 1
- Buddhist calendar: 1655
- Burmese calendar: 473
- Byzantine calendar: 6619–6620
- Chinese calendar: 庚寅年 (Metal Tiger); 3808 or 3601 — to — 辛卯年 (Metal Rabbit); 3809 or 3602
- Coptic calendar: 827–828
- Discordian calendar: 2277
- Ethiopian calendar: 1103–1104
- Hebrew calendar: 4871–4872
- Hindu calendars
- Vikram Samvat: 1167–1168
- Shaka Samvat: 1032–1033
- Kali Yuga: 4211–4212
- Holocene calendar: 11111
- Igbo calendar: 111–112
- Iranian calendar: 489–490
- Islamic calendar: 504–505
- Japanese calendar: Ten'ei 2 (天永２年)
- Javanese calendar: 1016–1017
- Julian calendar: 1111; MCXI
- Korean calendar: 3444
- Minguo calendar: 801 before ROC 民前801年
- Nanakshahi calendar: −357
- Seleucid era: 1422/1423 AG
- Thai solar calendar: 1653–1654
- Tibetan calendar: ལྕགས་ཕོ་སྟག་ལོ་ (male Iron-Tiger); 1237 or 856 or 84 — to — ལྕགས་མོ་ཡོས་ལོ་ (female Iron-Hare); 1238 or 857 or 85

Year 1111 (MCXI) was a common year starting on Sunday of the Julian calendar.

== Events ==
=== By place ===
==== Levant ====
- September 13–29 – Battle of Shaizar: Sultan Muhammad I Tapar appoints Mawdud ibn Altuntash, Turkic governor (atabeg) of Mosul, to lead a Seljuk expedition against the Crusaders. The composite force includes Muslim contingents from Damascus, Diyarbakır, Ahlat and some Persian troops, headed by Bursuq ibn Bursuq from Hamadan. The Crusaders (16,000 men), led by King Baldwin I of Jerusalem, are cut off from their supplies, and within two weeks (due to constant Seljuk skirmishes) forced to fall back on Afamiya in northern Syria.
- Winter – Crusaders, led by Baldwin I, besiege Tyre, without a supporting fleet. During the siege, a Byzantine embassy arrives in the Crusader camp. The Byzantines try to persuade Baldwin to join a coalition against Tancred, Italo-Norman prince of Galilee, but he refuses.

==== Europe ====
- March 27 – Battle of the Salnitsa river: Prince Vladimir of Kievan Rus' inflicts a crushing defeat on the Cumans (Polovtsy).
- April 13 – Henry V is crowned as Holy Roman Emperor by Pope Paschal II. Henry returns to Germany where he strengthens his power by granting privileges to the German nobles of the region of the Upper Rhine.
- October 5 – 18-year-old Baldwin VII succeeds his father, Robert II, as Count of Flanders until 1119.
- Almoravid forces under Syr ibn Abi Bakr capture Santarém and Sintra in Portugal. The efforts of the Berbers to reconquer lost ground also lead to the sack of Coimbra. The same year the city revolts against their lord.
- Rebellion on the borders of Normandy against the rule there of Henry I of England; Robert of Bellême is a leader of the rebels.
- The commune of Lodi Vecchio (known as Laus Pompeia) is besieged and destroyed by Milanese troops in northern Italy.

==== British Isles ====
- Domnall mac Taidc temporarily seizes the Kingdom of the Isles (the Hebrides and the Isle of Man) by force.
- In the vicinity of Welshpool, Iorwerth ap Bleddyn, prince of Powys, is killed through arson by his uncle Madog ap Rhiryd, allowing Cadwgan ap Bleddyn (Iorwerth's brother) to return to rule all of Powys, but soon afterwards Madog kills Cadwgan also, allowing Owain ap Cadwgan (son of Cadwgan) to become ruler of much of the kingdom.

=== By topic ===
==== Education ====
- The Donglin Academy, a Chinese educational institution, is established in Wuxi during the Northern Song dynasty.

==== Religion ====
- The Synod of Rathbreasail marks the transition of the Irish church from a monastic to a diocesan structure.

== Births ==
- Stephen of Armenia, Armenian nobleman (d. 1165)
- Approximate date
  - Afonso I (the Conqueror), King of Portugal (d. 1185)
  - Agnes of Babenberg, High Duchess of Poland (d. 1163)
  - Andrey Bogolyubsky, Prince of Vladimir-Suzdal (d. 1174)
  - Henry II, Duke of Limburg (House of Ardenne) (d. 1167)
  - Josceline de Bohon, bishop of Salisbury (d. 1184)

== Deaths ==
- January 29 – Piotr I, bishop of Wrocław
- February 22 – Roger Borsa, Italo-Norman nobleman
- March 3 – Bohemond I, Italo-Norman nobleman (b. 1054)
- April 12 – Berthold II, German nobleman (b. 1050)
- April 17 – Robert of Molesme, French abbot (b. 1028)
- June 15 – Yun Kwan, Korean general (b. 1040)
- September 27 – Vekenega, Croatian abbess
- October 5 – Robert II, Count of Flanders, died in battle (b. 1065)
- October 7 – Anna Polovetskaya, Kievan princess
- October 26 (probable year) – Gómez González, Castilian nobleman, killed in battle
- November 8 – Otto II, German nobleman, murdered
- December 19
  - Agnes of Rheinfelden, German noblewoman
  - Al-Ghazali, Persian theologian (b. 1058)
- Cadwgan ap Bleddyn, Welsh Prince of Powys, murdered (b. 1051)
- Iorwerth ap Bleddyn, Welsh Prince of Powys, murdered (b. 1053)
- Ōe no Masafusa, Japanese poet and writer (b. 1041)
- Richard II, Italian consul and Duke of Gaeta
