= Madog ap Rhiryd =

Madog ap Rhiryd was a 12th-century Welsh prince of part of Powys. His birth and death dates are unknown. He was a son of Rhiryd ap Bleddyn.

In 1110 he allied himself with his cousin, Owain ap Cadwgan, against Henry I of England. After Henry stripped Owain of his title and replaced him with Iorwerth ap Bleddyn, their uncle, Madog killed Iorwerth in 1111. When Owain's father, Cadwgan, was also killed by Madog at Welshpool the same year, Owain became ruler of much of Powys. He employed his uncle Maredudd ap Bleddyn as penteulu (captain of the guard). In 1113 Maredudd captured Madog and sent him to Owain. Owain took vengeance for the killing of his father by gouging out Madog's eyes. Nothing more of him is known to history.
