= Wales in the Middle Ages =

Period of history

Wales in the Middle Ages covers the history of the country that is now called Wales, from the departure of the Romans in the early fifth century to the annexation of Wales into the Kingdom of England in the early sixteenth century. This period of about 1,000 years saw the development of regional Welsh kingdoms, Celtic conflict with the Anglo-Saxons, reducing Celtic territories, and conflict between the Welsh and the Anglo-Normans from the 11th century.

== Early Middle Ages: 411–1066 ==
When the Roman garrison of Britain was withdrawn in 410, the various British states were left self-governing. Evidence for a continuing Roman influence after the departure of the Roman legions is provided by an inscribed stone from Gwynedd dated between the late 5th and mid-6th centuries commemorating a certain Cantiorix who was described as a citizen (cives) of Gwynedd and a cousin of Maglos the magistrate (magistratus). There was considerable Irish colonisation in Dyfed, where there are many stones with ogham inscriptions. Wales had become Christian under the Romans, and the Age of the Saints (approximately 500–700) was marked by the establishment of monastic settlements throughout the country, by religious leaders such as Saint David, Illtud and Saint Teilo.

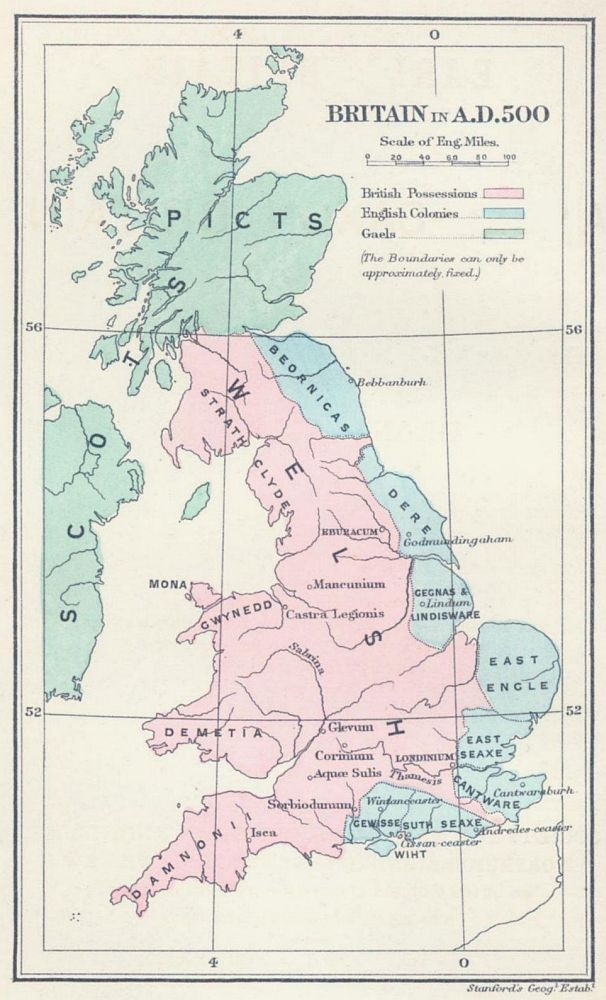

One of the reasons for the Roman withdrawal was the pressure put upon the empire's military resources by the incursion of barbarian tribes from the east. These tribes, including the Angles and Saxons, gradually took control of eastern and southern Britain. At the Battle of Chester in 616, the forces of Powys and other British kingdoms were defeated by the Northumbrians under Æthelfrith, with king Selyf ap Cynan among the dead. It has been suggested that this battle finally severed the land connection between Wales and the kingdoms of the Hen Ogledd ("Old North"), the Brittonic-speaking regions of what is now southern Scotland and northern England, including Rheged, Strathclyde, Elmet and Gododdin, where Old Welsh was also spoken. From the 8th century on, Wales was by far the largest of the three remnant Brittonic areas in Britain, the other two being the Hen Ogledd and Cornwall.

Wales was divided into a number of separate kingdoms, the largest of these being Gwynedd in northwest Wales and Powys in the east. Gwynedd was the most powerful of these kingdoms in the 6th and 7th centuries, under rulers such as Maelgwn Gwynedd (died 547) and Cadwallon ap Cadfan (died 634/5) who in alliance with Penda of Mercia was able to lead his armies as far as the Kingdom of Northumbria and control it for a period. Following Cadwallon's death in battle the following year, his successor Cadafael Cadomedd ap Cynfeddw also allied himself with Penda against Northumbria but thereafter Gwynedd, like the other Welsh kingdoms, was mainly engaged in defensive warfare against the growing power of Mercia.

=== Rise of Gwynedd: 700–1066 ===
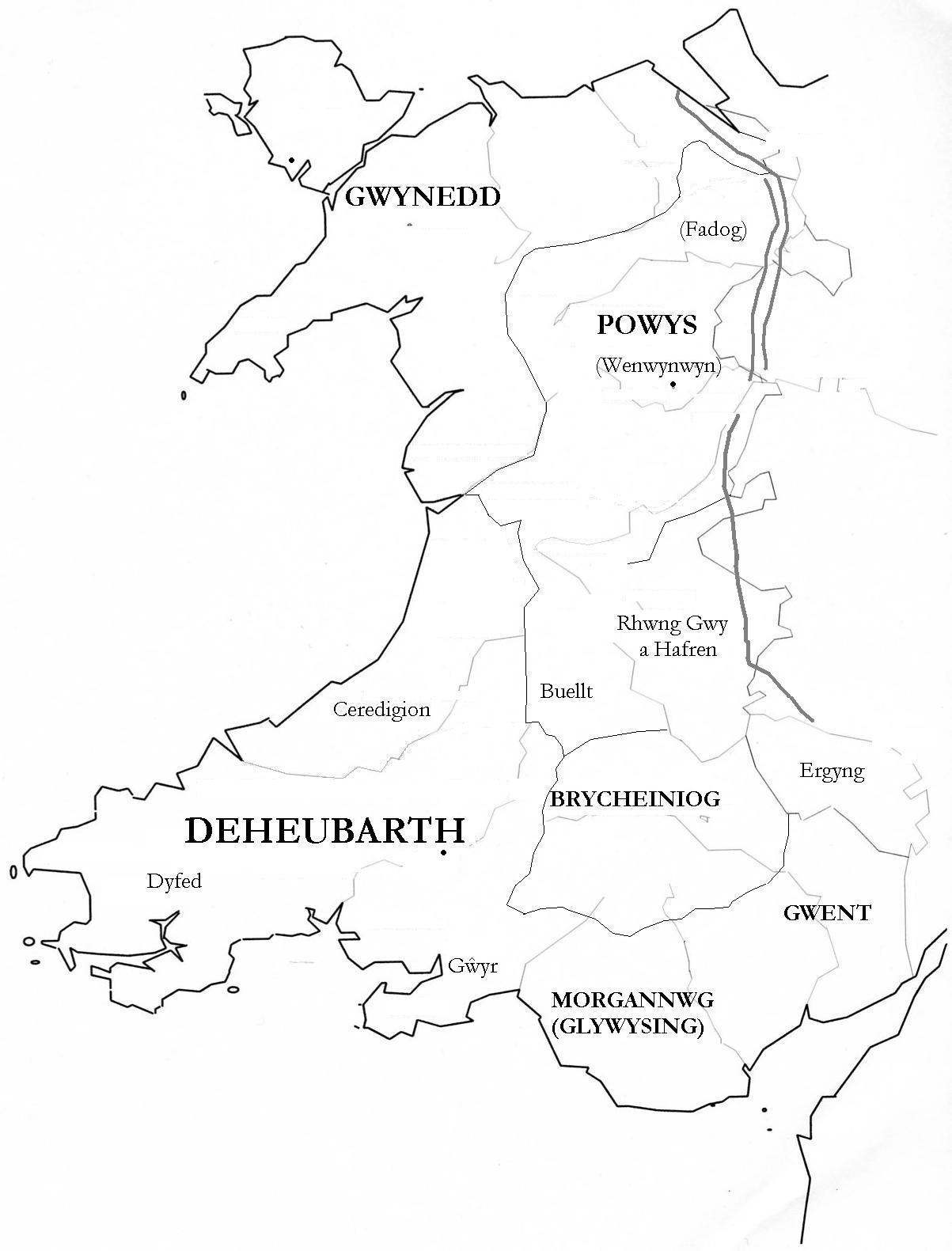
Medieval kingdoms of Wales shown within the boundaries of the present day country of Wales and not inclusive of all

Powys as the easternmost of the major kingdoms of Wales came under the most pressure from the English in Cheshire, Shropshire and Herefordshire. This kingdom originally extended east into areas now in England, and its ancient capital, Pengwern, has been variously identified as modern Shrewsbury or a site north of Baschurch. These areas were lost to the kingdom of Mercia. The construction of the earthwork known as Offa's Dyke (usually attributed to Offa of Mercia in the 8th century) may have marked an agreed border.

For a single man to rule the whole country during this period was rare. This is often ascribed to the inheritance system practised in Wales. All sons received an equal share of their father's property (including illegitimate sons), resulting in the division of territories. However, the Welsh laws prescribe this system of division for land in general, not for kingdoms, where there is provision for an edling (or heir) to the kingdom to be chosen, usually by the king. Any son, legitimate or illegitimate, could be chosen as edling and there were frequently disappointed candidates prepared to challenge the chosen heir.

The first to rule a considerable part of Wales was Rhodri the Great, originally king of Gwynedd during the 9th century, who was able to extend his rule to Powys and Ceredigion. On his death his realms were divided between his sons. Rhodri's grandson, Hywel Dda (Hywel the Good), formed the kingdom of Deheubarth by joining smaller kingdoms in the southwest and had extended his rule to most of Wales by 942. He is traditionally associated with the codification of Welsh law at a council which he called at Whitland, the laws from then on usually being called the "Laws of Hywel". Hywel followed a policy of peace with the English. On his death in 949 his sons were able to keep control of Deheubarth but lost Gwynedd to the traditional dynasty of this kingdom.

Wales was now coming under increasing attack by Vikings, particularly Danish raids in the period between 950 and 1000. According to the chronicle Brut y Tywysogion, Godfrey Haroldson carried off two thousand captives from Anglesey in 987, and the king of Gwynedd, Maredudd ab Owain is reported to have redeemed many of his subjects from slavery by paying the Danes a large ransom.

Gruffydd ap Llywelyn was the only ruler to be able to unite the Welsh kingdoms under his rule. Originally king of Gwynedd, by 1055 he was ruler of almost all of Wales and had annexed parts of England around the border. However, he was defeated by Harold Godwinson in 1063 and killed by his own men. His territories were again divided into the traditional kingdoms.

== High Middle Ages: 1067–1283 ==
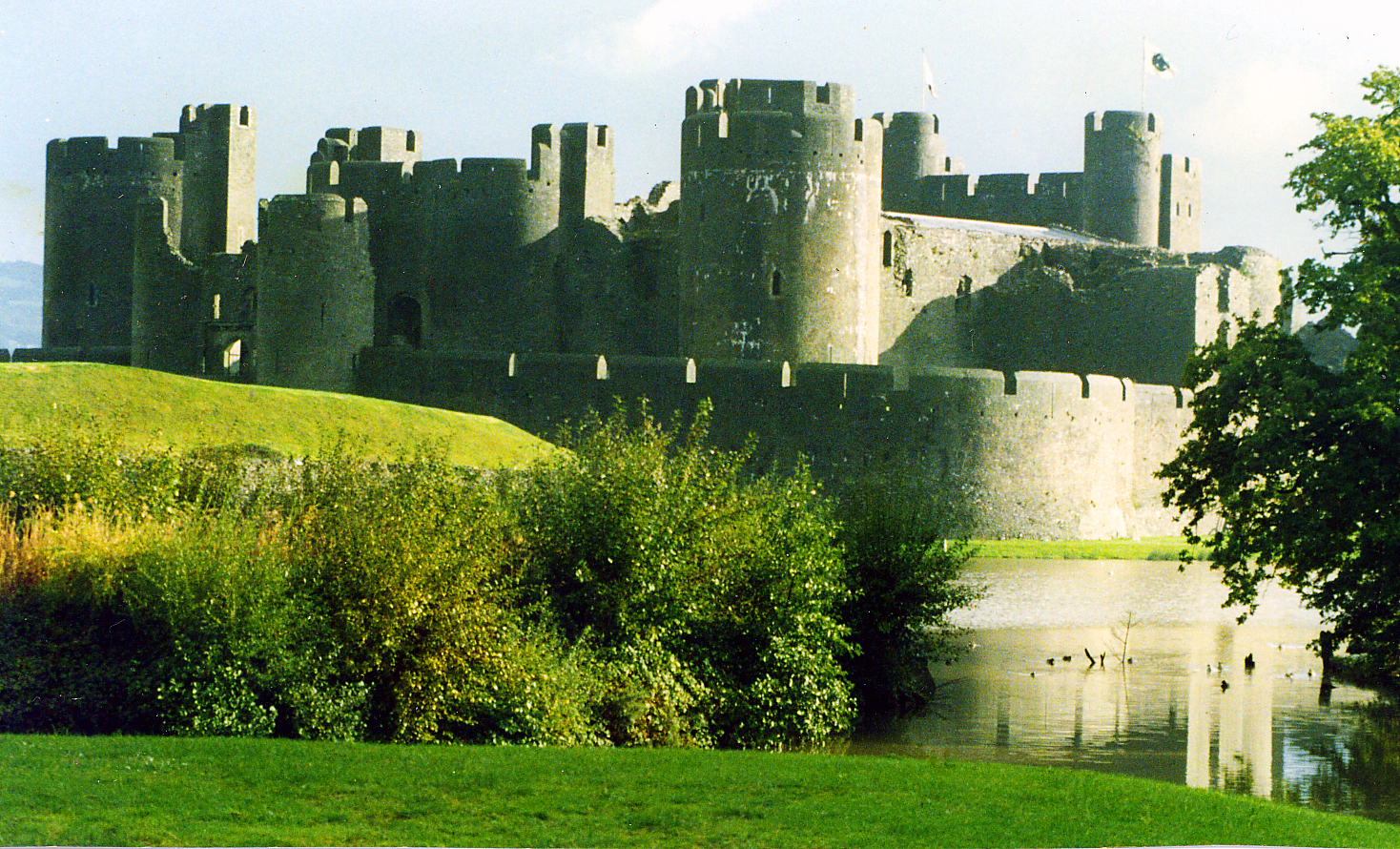
The construction of Caerphilly Castle (pictured) between 1268 and 1271 by Gilbert de Clare led to a dispute between Llywelyn ap Gruffudd and the English crown, one of the issues that led to the wars of 1277 and 1282 and the end of Welsh independence

At the time of the Norman conquest of England in 1066, the dominant ruler in Wales was Bleddyn ap Cynfyn, who was king of Gwynedd and Powys. While the Normans consolidated their power in England, in the judgement of historian Rees Davies Wales was "utterly peripheral to their ambitions and concerns". Welsh support for Eadric the Wild and Edwin of Mercia in their efforts opposing Norman rule led the Normans to turn their attention to Wales. The initial Norman successes were in the south, where William FitzOsbern, 1st Earl of Hereford overran the Kingdom of Gwent before 1070. By 1074 the forces of the Earl of Shrewsbury were ravaging Deheubarth.

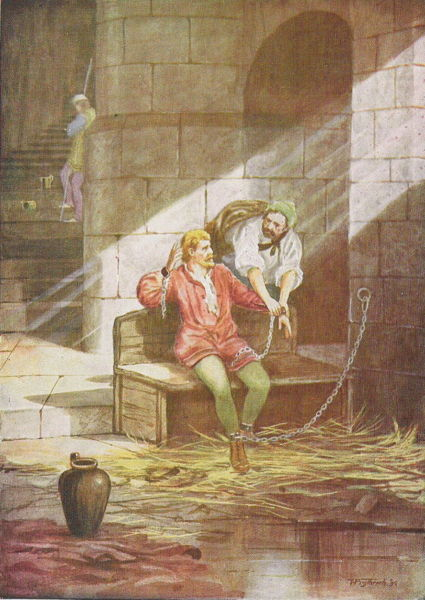
Depiction of Gruffydd ap Cynan escaping from Hugh d'Avranches, the Earl of Chester", painted by T Prytherch

The killing of Bleddyn ap Cynfyn in 1075 led to civil war and gave the Normans an opportunity to seize lands in northern Wales. In 1081, Gruffudd ap Cynan, who had just won the throne of Gwynedd from Trahaearn ap Caradog at the Battle of Mynydd Carn, was enticed to a meeting with the Earl of Chester and Earl of Shrewsbury and promptly seized and imprisoned, leading to the seizure of much of Gwynedd by the Normans. Rhys ap Tewdwr of Deheubarth was killed in 1093 in Brycheiniog, and his kingdom was seized and divided between various Norman lordships. The Norman conquest of Wales appeared virtually complete.

In 1094, however, there was a general Welsh revolt against Norman rule, and gradually territories were won back. Gruffudd ap Cynan was eventually able to build a strong kingdom in Gwynedd. His son, Owain Gwynedd, allied with Gruffydd ap Rhys of Deheubarth, won a crushing victory over the Normans at the Battle of Crug Mawr in 1136 and annexed Ceredigion. Owain followed his father on the throne of Gwynedd the following year and ruled until his death in 1170. He was able to profit from the Anarchy in England to extend the borders of Gwynedd further east than ever before as Stephen of Blois and the Empress Matilda were engaged in a struggle for the English throne.

The Kingdom of Powys also had a strong ruler at this time in Madog ap Maredudd, but when his death in 1160 was quickly followed by the death of his heir, Llywelyn ap Madog, Powys was split into two parts and never subsequently reunited.

In the south, Gruffydd ap Rhys was killed in 1137, but his four sons, who all ruled Deheubarth in turn, were eventually able to win back most of their grandfather's kingdom from the Normans. The youngest of the four, Rhys ap Gruffydd, ruled from 1155 to 1197. In 1171 Rhys met Henry II of England and came to an agreement with him whereby Rhys had to pay a tribute but was confirmed in all his conquests and was later named Justiciar of South Wales. Rhys held a festival of poetry and song at his court at Cardigan over Christmas 1176, which is generally regarded as the first recorded Eisteddfod. Owain Gwynedd's death led to the splitting of Gwynedd between his sons, while Rhys made Deheubarth dominant in Wales for a time.

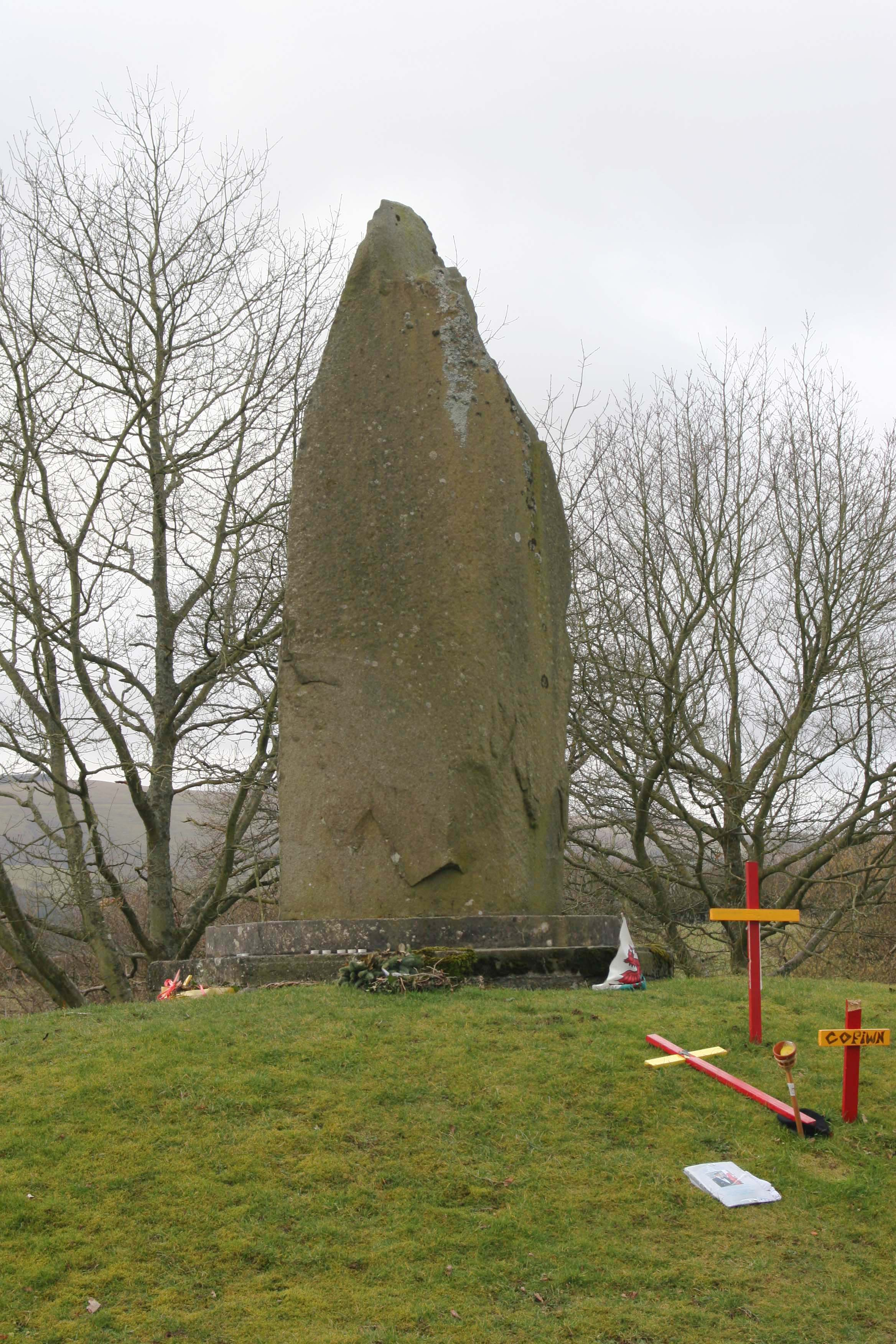
The Llywelyn Monument at Cilmeri

Out of the power struggle in Gwynedd eventually arose one of the greatest of Welsh leaders, Llywelyn the Great (Welsh: Llywelyn Fawr), who was sole ruler of Gwynedd by 1200 and by his death in 1240 was effectively ruler of much of Wales. Llywelyn made his 'capital' and headquarters at Abergwyngregyn on the north coast, overlooking the Menai Strait. His son, Gruffydd ap Llywelyn Fawr, followed him as ruler of Gwynedd, but Henry III of England would not allow him to inherit his father's position elsewhere in Wales. War broke out in 1241 and then again in 1245, and the issue was still in the balance when Dafydd died suddenly in early 1246 at Abergwyngregyn without leaving an heir. Gruffydd had been killed trying to escape from the Tower of London in 1244.

Gruffudd had left four sons, and a period of internal conflict between three of these ended in the rise to power of Llywelyn ap Gruffudd, known as "Llywelyn Our Last Leader" (Welsh: Llywelyn Ein Llyw Olaf) or "Llywelyn the Last". The Treaty of Montgomery in 1267 confirmed Llywelyn in control, directly or indirectly, over a large part of Wales. However, Llywelyn's claims in Wales conflicted with Edward I of England, and war followed in 1277. Llywelyn was obliged to seek terms, and the Treaty of Aberconwy greatly restricted his authority. War broke out again when Llywelyn's brother Dafydd ap Gruffydd attacked Hawarden Castle on Palm Sunday 1282. On 11 December 1282, Llywelyn was lured into a meeting in Builth Wells castle with unknown Marchers, where he was killed and his army subsequently destroyed. Dafydd continued an increasingly forlorn resistance but was captured in June 1283 and was hanged, drawn and quartered at Shrewsbury. In effect, Wales became England's first colony until it was formally annexed through the Laws in Wales Acts 1535 and 1542.

== Late Middle Ages: 1283–1542 ==
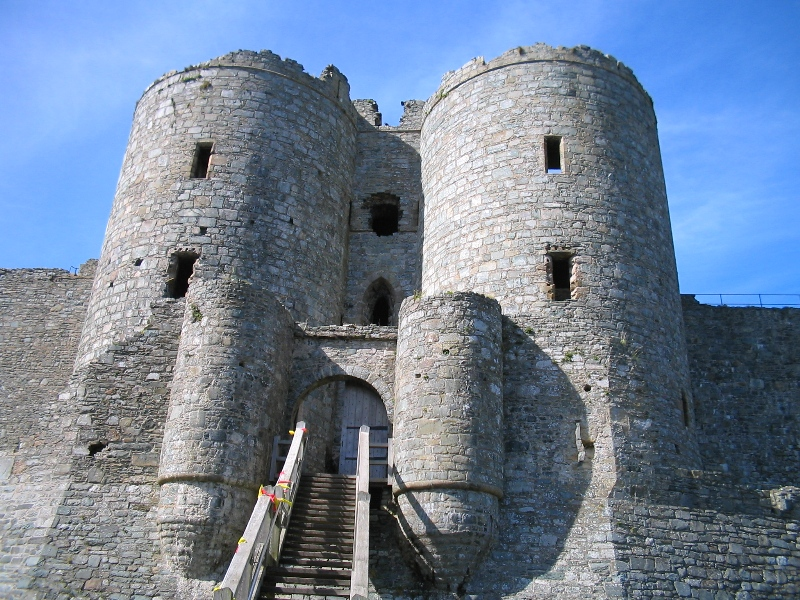
Harlech Castle was one of a series built by Edward I of England to consolidate his conquest

After passing the Statute of Rhuddlan, which restricted Welsh law, King Edward's ring of impressive stone castles assisted the domination of Wales, and he crowned his conquest by giving the title Prince of Wales to his son and heir in 1301. Wales became, effectively, part of England, even though its people spoke a different language and had a different culture. English kings appointed a Council of Wales, sometimes presided over by the heir to the throne. This Council normally sat in Ludlow, now in England but at that time still part of the disputed border area in the Welsh Marches. Welsh literature, particularly poetry, continued to flourish however, with the lesser nobility now taking over from the princes as the patrons of the poets. Dafydd ap Gwilym, who flourished in the middle of the 14th century, is considered by many to be the greatest of the Welsh poets.

There were a number of rebellions including ones led by Madog ap Llywelyn in 1294–1295 and by Llywelyn Bren, Lord of Senghenydd, in 1316–1318. In the 1370s the last representative in the male line of the ruling house of Gwynedd, Owain Lawgoch, twice planned an invasion of Wales with French support. The English government responded to the threat by sending an agent to assassinate Owain in Poitou in 1378.

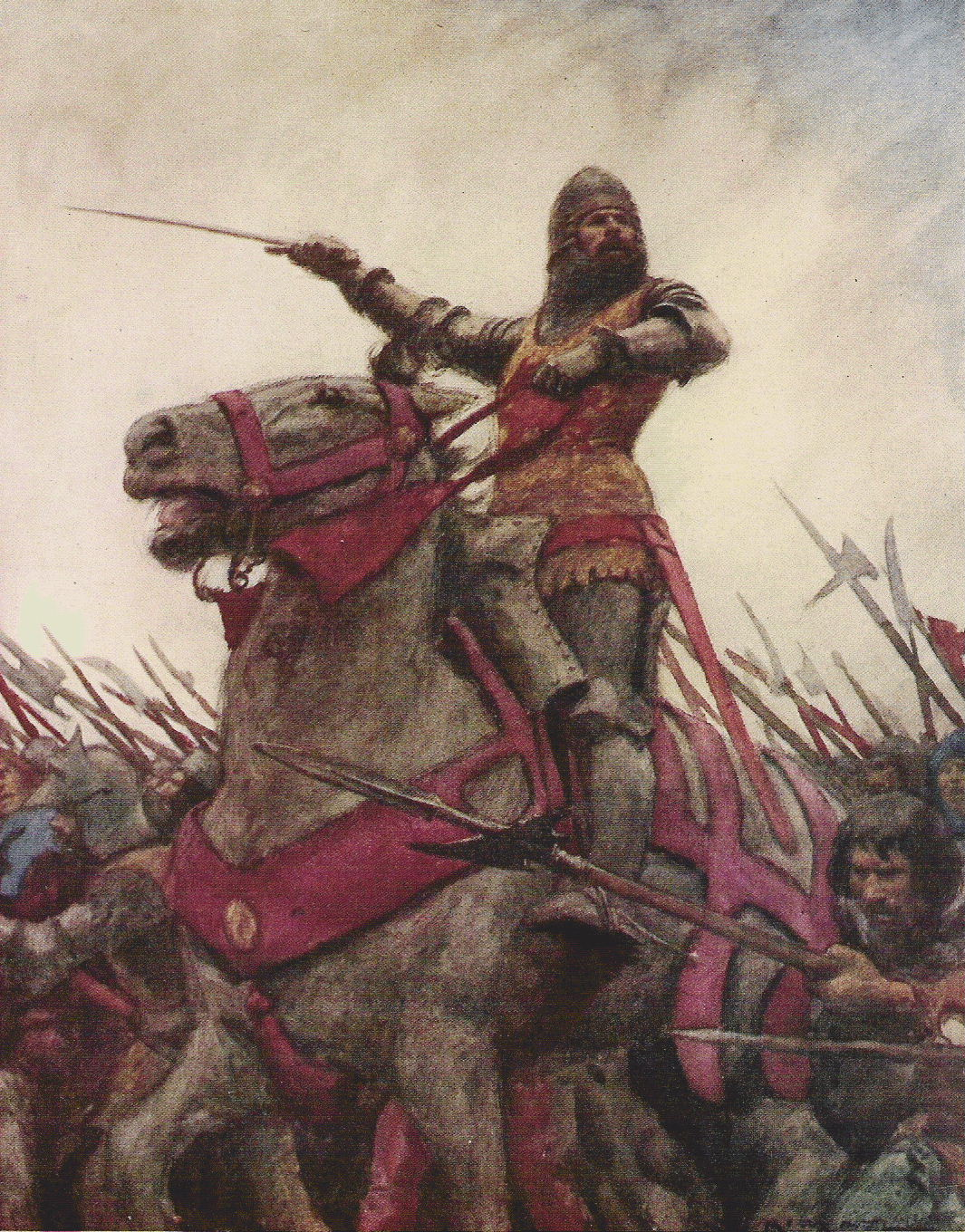
Owain Glyndŵr

In 1400, a Welsh nobleman, Owain Glyndŵr, revolted against Henry IV of England. Owain inflicted a number of defeats on the English forces and for a few years controlled most of Wales. Some of his achievements included holding the first Welsh Parliament at Machynlleth and plans for two universities. Eventually the king's forces were able to regain control of Wales and the rebellion died out, but Owain himself was never captured. His rebellion caused a great upsurge in Welsh identity and he was widely supported by Welsh people throughout the country.

As a response to Glyndŵr's rebellion, the English parliament passed the Penal Laws against the Welsh people in 1402. These prohibited the Welsh from carrying arms, from holding office and from dwelling in fortified towns. These prohibitions also applied to Englishmen who married Welsh women. These laws remained in force after the rebellion, although in practice they were gradually relaxed.

In the Wars of the Roses, which began in 1455, both sides made considerable use of Welsh troops. The main figures in Wales were the two Earls of Pembroke, the Yorkist William Herbert and the Lancastrian Jasper Tudor. A Council of Wales and the Marches was created to rule Wales, by the Lancastrian Henry VI for his son Edward of Westminster in 1457. The Council was created again in 1471 by Edward IV for his son Edward V.

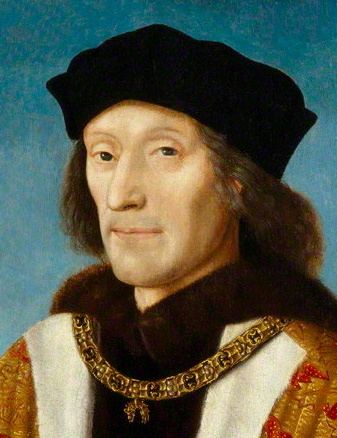
Henry Tudor, later King Henry VII

In 1485 Jasper's nephew, Henry Tudor, landed in Wales with a small force to launch his bid for the throne of England. Henry was of Welsh descent, counting princes such as Rhys ap Gruffydd among his ancestors, and his cause gained much support in Wales. Henry defeated King Richard III of England at the Battle of Bosworth Field with an army containing many Welsh soldiers and gained the throne as Henry VII of England. Henry VII again created a Council of Wales and the Marches for his son Prince Arthur.

Under his son, Henry VIII of England, the Laws in Wales Acts 1535 and 1542 were passed, integrating Wales with England in legal terms, abolishing the Welsh legal system, and banning the Welsh language from any official role or status, but it did for the first time define the Wales–England border and allowed members representing constituencies in Wales to be elected to the English Parliament. They also abolished any legal distinction between the Welsh and the English, thereby effectively ending the Penal Code although this was not formally repealed.

== See also ==
- King of the Britons
- King of Wales
- List of rulers of Wales
- Anglo-Saxon settlement of Britain
- Sub-Roman Britain
