= Six Ashes =

Village in Shropshire, England

Coordinates: 52.496°N 2.318°W

- Location within Shropshire
- Unitary authority: Shropshire
- Ceremonial county: Shropshire
- Region: West Midlands
- Country: England
- Sovereign state: United Kingdom
- Police: West Mercia
- Fire: Shropshire
- Ambulance: West Midlands

Six Ashes is a small village in Shropshire, England, on the Shropshire side of the border with Staffordshire. It is known as Onennau Meigion in Welsh literature and folklore, being the site of six ash trees. The village was the tripoint for the 1405 proposed Tripartite Indenture which would have divided England and Wales into three realms.
