= Owen Glendower (Shakespeare character) =

Character in William Shakespeare's play

- Henry IV, Part 1 character
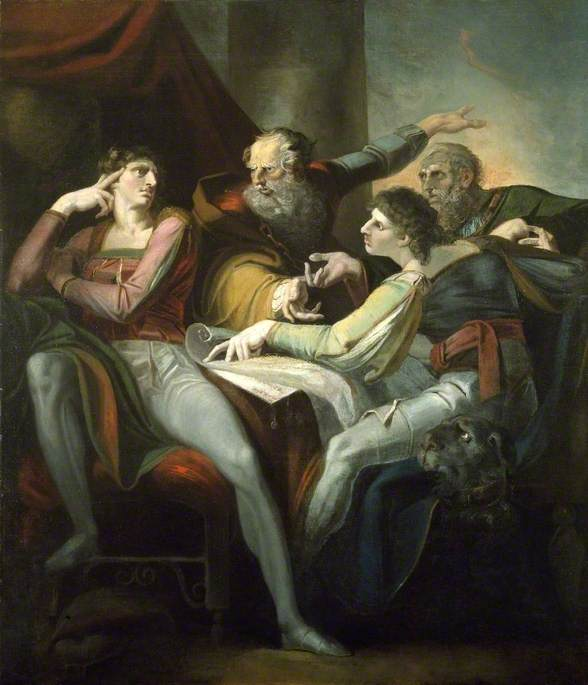
- Dispute between Hotspur, Glendower, Mortimer and Worcester (painted by Henry Fuseli 1784); Glendower is the figure in the centre wearing yellow
- Created by: William Shakespeare
- Based on: Owain Glyndŵr

In-universe information
- Affiliation: Opposed to Henry IV
- Family: Catrin (daughter)

Owen Glendower is a character in William Shakespeare's play Henry IV, Part 1 based on the historical Owain Glyndŵr. Glendower is referred to in Henry IV, Part Two, but he does not have a speaking role in that play.

== Origins ==
Owen Glendower is based on Owain Glyndŵr (c. 1359 – c. 1415), a Welsh leader involved in opposition to Henry IV in what is now called the Glyndŵr Rising. The spelling Owen Glendower is the anglicisation used in Holinshed's Chronicles, which served as one of Shakespeare's main sources for his history play.

Shakespeare makes some decisions that build upon the historical record. In Shakespeare's text, Bolingbroke refers to him as "great magician, damned Glendower" (1.3). Further, Glendower reports "Three times hath Henry Bolingbroke made head/Against my power; thrice from the banks of Wye/And sandy-bottom'd Severn have I sent him/Bootless home and weather-beaten back" (3.1). This is likely a reference to the belief that Glendower's magic enabled him to control the weather. For example, Holinshed's Chronicles recounts that during the reign of Henry IV, "About mid of August, the king, to chastise the presumptuous attempts of the Welshmen, went with a great power of men into Wales, to pursue the captain of the Welsh, rebel Owen Glendower, but in effect he lost his labor; for Owen conveyed himself out of the way, into his known lurking places, and (as was thought) through art magic, he caused such foul weather of winds, tempest, rain, snow, and hail to be raised, for the annoyance of the king's army, that the like had not been heard of; in such sort, that the king was constrained to return home, having caused his people yet to spoil and burn first a great part of the country." Shakespeare's Glendower tells Hotspur, "I can speak English, lord, as well as you,/For I was trained up in the English court." According to David Bevington, "Holinshed reports that Glendower became an 'utter barrister, or an apprentice of the law', and adds that others 'have written that he served this King Henry the Fourth, before he came to attain the crown, in room of an esquire'".

Other elements of Shakespeare's presentation are changes from the historical record. According to Holinshed's Chronicles, there were Welsh fighters present at the Battle of Shrewsbury coming to the aid of the Percy rebellion. In contrast, the Welsh do not appear after 3.1, and they are suggested to have failed to appear for the rebellion. Although the rebels draw up the Tripartite Indentures in 3.1, historically this happened after Shrewsbury and thus after the events of the play.

== Role in the play ==
Glendower is the leader of the Welsh part of the rebellion against Henry IV. Edmund Mortimer, who has a claim to the throne as Richard II's heir, has married Glendower's daughter, Catrin, who is referred to as Lady Mortimer. Glendower only appears in act 3, scene 1. In that scene, the rebels draw up the Tripartite Indenture explaining how they will divide the country when they overthrow Henry IV. Glendower and his forces, in Shakespeare's presentation of events, do not arrive, causing Hotspur to have to lead the rebels against Henry IV with diminished forces. This contributes to Hotspur's defeat.

== Critical analysis ==
J. L. Simmons finds the reason given for Glendower's failure to appear, that he was "overrul'd by prophecies" (4.4.18) "comically appropriate for the 'wild and irregular' wizard (1. 3)."

Terence Hawkes appears to characterize Glendower and his daughter as a high point in the depiction of Welsh characters in Shakespeare's literature. Glendower and his daughter both speak Welsh, and Glendower is shown to be bilingual, translating for his daughter during her appearance, as opposed "to the garrulous but monolingual Fluellen, and the caricatured Sir Hugh Evens in The Merry Wives of Windsor." Hawke notes that there may be an unfortunate undertone to Glendower's boasting that he can speak English as well as the Northern Hotspur, depending on whether a production shows the thick-speaking Hotspur to be well-spoken. As speaking thick referred to speaking quickly, Shakespeare probably did not mean this as a pejorative comment on Glendower's capacities.

Megan S. Lloyd regards Glendower, particularly in his relationship to the English Hotspur, as representing the relationship between England and Wales: "The Glendower Mortimer describes is one worthy, well read, mystical, valiant, generous, cordial, affable, and more than tolerant of the likes of Hotspur. However, Mortimer's words also convey Glendower's potential for eruption. The tenuous relationship between Hotspur and Glendower recalls that of Wales and England. Assimilated into England and reaping the economic benefit of such an arrangement, the Welsh tolerate much, even the criticism of their culture, customs, and language; yet, if pushed too far, they pose a debilitating, dangerous force." In contrast, she notes that Mortimer and Glendower's daughter seem to have a positive and loving relationship, which would suggest that Welsh/English relationships do not have to be acrimonious.

== Performance history ==
For an extended period of history, Glendower and his daughter were not shown on stage. Thomas Betterton’s 1680s edition cut of 3.1. John Bell’s 1774 edition excised 3.1 as a “strange unmeaning, wild scene” (43). In 1808, John Philip Kemble cut 3.1 entirely. Not until a 1864 revival at the Drury Lane theatre did the audience, for the first time since before Betterton, hear Lady Mortimer’s Welsh song and all of 3.1. That amounts to a 180-year absence from English stages.

He is occasionally still removed from stage productions. Graham Abbey’s 2016 Breath of Kings: Rebellion adaptation, which combined Richard II and 1 Henry IV, completely removed 3.1, where the characters discuss how to rise to rebellion.
