= Robert Pantulf =

12th-century Anglo-Norman baron

- Died: between 1130 and 1138
- Occupation: baron
- Children: Ivo Pantulf
- Parents: William Pantulf; Lescelina

Robert Pantulf (fl. 1130) was an Anglo-Norman nobleman.

Pantulf was the son of William Pantulf and Lescelina. Robert was the second son. His father was the first Baron of Wem and the family was originally from Noron in the Calvados region of Normandy. Robert's brothers were Philip, Ivo, and Arnald.

Pantulf first enters the historical record when around 1088 he was involved in an attack on Holy Trinity Abbey in Caen. Pantulf was accused of stealing 6 pounds (2.7 kg) of silver from the nuns of the abbey.

Around 1130, Pantulf was the witness on a charter of Wiliam, the constable of Chester, along with an Ivo Pantulf, who may be either Robert's brother or son. Pantulf also appears on the Pipe Roll of 1130, where he is mentioned as one of the adversaries in a judicial duel to settle a dispute with Hugh Malbanc. Malbanc was a neighbor of Pantulf's. There is no record of whether this duel was ever fought or what the outcome was.

Pantulf succeeded to his father's lands in England around 1112, with the Norman lands going to Robert's eldest brother Philip. Robert also succeeded to his father's English lordship and is considered the second Baron of Wem. The barony was centered in Wem, and had at least 11 manors in Hodnet hundred in Shropshire. There were other manors in Shropshire as well as lands in Staffordshire and Warwickshire.

Pantulf died sometime before early 1138, probably between December 1137 and May 1138. Other sources imply that he was dead before 18 October 1130, when his son was named as Baron of Wem as a witness to a charter. His heir was his son, Ivo Pantulf.
