= Battle of Mechain =

1070 battle in Powys, Wales

Coordinates: 52.776°N 3.204°W

Date	1070
Location	Powys, Wales
Result	Victory for Bleddyn ap Cynfyn

Belligerents
Bleddyn ap Cynfyn; Rhiwallon ap Cynfyn †	Maredudd ap Gruffydd †; Idwal ap Gruffydd †

The Battle of Mechain was fought in Powys, Wales, in 1070, for rule of the Welsh kingdoms of Gwynedd and Powys. The battlefield may be near Llanfechain in northern Powys. A written account is included in the Brut y Tywysogion, the medieval Welsh chronicle of the princes. It is also referred to in the work of medieval poets such as Lewys Glyn Cothi.

After the murder of Gruffydd ap Llywelyn, Harold Godwinson married his widow Ealdgyth and divided Gruffydd's realm into the traditional kingdoms of Gwynedd and Powys, the rule of which were given to Bleddyn ap Cynfyn and his brother Rhiwallon ap Cynfyn. Gruffydd left two sons— Maredudd and Idwal–who in 1070 challenged Bleddyn and Rhiwallon at Mechain in an attempt to win back part of their father's kingdom. However, both sons were defeated, Idwal (or Ithel) being killed in combat and Maredudd dying of exposure after the battle.

Rhiwallon was also killed in this battle, leaving Bleddyn to rule Gwynedd and Powys alone.
