= Rhiryd ap Bleddyn =

Welsh king of Powys

Rhiryd ap Bleddyn King of Powys
- Born: 1049
- Died: 1088 (aged 38–39); Powys, Wales
- Children: 2+, including Madog
- Father: Bleddyn ap Cynfyn
- Relatives: Maredudd ap Bleddyn (brother); Owain ap Cadwgan (nephew)

Rhiryd ap Bleddyn (1049–1088) was a Welsh king of Powys. He was a son of Bleddyn ap Cynfyn and Haer verch Gyllin.

He was killed in Powys in the same battle against Rhys ap Tewdwr that killed his brother, Madog ap Bleddyn.

His wife is unknown. He had two sons, Madog and Ithel. Rhiryd's brother, Maredudd, captured Madog and turned him over to their nephew, Owain ap Cadwgan, who blinded him. Maredudd's son, Gruffudd, killed Ithel in 1125.
