= Rhiwallon ap Cynfyn =

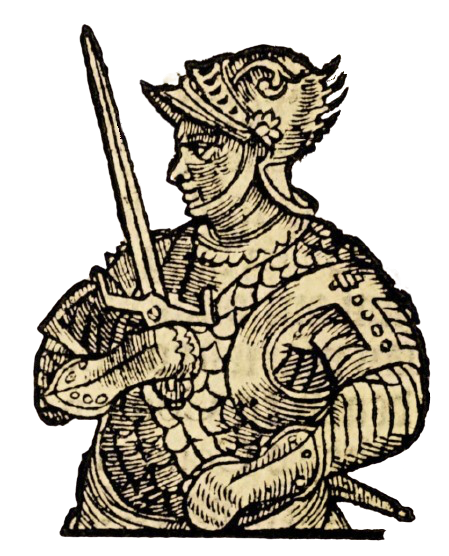
- A fanciful illustration of Rhiwallon ap Cynfyn from the Historie of Cambria (1584)

King of Gwynedd and Powys
- Reign: 1063–1070
- Predecessor: Gruffydd ap Llywelyn
- Successor: Bleddyn ap Cynfyn
- Co-ruler: Bleddyn ap Cynfyn
- Died: 1070
- Spouse: Haer ferch Gillyn
- House: Mathrafal
- Father: Cynfyn ap Gwerystan
- Mother: Angharad ferch Maredudd ap Owain

Rhiwallon ap Cynfyn (c. 1020 – c. 1070) was an 11th-century Welsh King and co-ruler of the kingdoms of Gwynedd and Powys from 1063 to 1070. The son of Cynfyn ap Gwerstan and brother of King Bleddyn of Powys. Through his mother Angharad, he was half-brother to King Gruffydd ap Llywelyn as well. Following the 1063 invasion of Wales by Harold and Tostig Godwinson that overthrew Gruffydd, Rhiwallon and Bleddyn jointly received Powys and Gwynedd on condition of faithfully serving Edward the Confessor "everywhere by water and by land".

In August 1067, Rhiwallon and Bleddyn joined Eadric the Wild in an attack upon Herefordshire as part of the Saxon resistance to the recent Norman Conquest of England. In 1070, the two brothers fought in the Battle of Mechain against Gruffydd's sons Maredudd and Idwal. Though victorious, Rhiwallon was slain in battle and left Bleddyn sole prince of North Wales.

== Children ==
- Gwladys, who married Rhys ap Tewdwr

== See also ==
- Kingdom of Gwynedd
- Kingdom of Powys
- Kings of Wales family trees

== Sources ==
- Powel, David (1584). The historie of Cambria, now called Wales: a part of the most famous Yland of Brytaine, written in the Brytish language aboue two hundreth yeares past. Translated by Llwyd, Humphrey. London: Rafe Newberrie and Henrie Denham. IA historieofcambri00cara.
