= Ivo Pantulf =

12th-century Anglo-Norman baron

- Born: c. 1114
- Died: 1175
- Occupation: baron
- Spouse: Alicia de Verdun
- Children: Hugh, Hamelin, Brice, William, Norman
- Parent: Robert Pantulf

Ivo Pantulf was an Anglo-Norman nobleman and feudal baron of Wem in Shropshire.

Pantulf was the son of Robert Pantulf, who was lord of Wem. He was probably born around 1114.

Pantulf is the witness on a document from Nicholas de Stafford to Kenilworth Priory in October 1130. He was a witness on a royal charter in 1137 or 1138.

Pantulf became lord of Wem on his father's death, which occurred sometime before 1137 or 1138. His holding of the lordship of Wem is considered to have made him the third Baron of Wem.

Pantulf gave lands to Shrewsbury Abbey between 1141 and 1155. He also gave lands to Combermere Abbey in the same period. He witnessed a few more charters between 1152 and 1160. Late in his life he gave land to Haughmond Abbey.

Pantulf married twice. From his first marriage, he had three sons – Hugh, Hamelin, and Brice. The second marriage was to Alicia de Verdun, either the daughter of Bertram II de Verdun and sister of Norman de Verdun of Alton Castle or the daughter of Norman de Verdun. He had two more sons – William and Norman – from his second marriage.

Pantulf died in 1175. His lands at Wem and its lordship went to his son Hugh.
