= King of Wales =

Welsh royal title

Latin versions of "King of Wales" (Welsh: Brenin Cymru) were titles used on a handful of occasions in the Middle Ages. They were very rarely claimed or applied by contemporaries, because Wales, much like Ireland, usually had neither the political unity nor the sovereignty of other contemporary European kingdoms such as England and Scotland. While many early rulers of areas within Wales used the title of "King", they were not, and did not claim to be, rulers of all Wales.

Geoffrey of Monmouth's History of the Kings of Britain achieved wide circulation from 1136. It has almost no historical value, but it popularised a fictitious list of legendary kings of Britain that remains central to the stories which make up the Matter of Britain.

== King ==
Many early rulers of areas within Wales used titles (Rex, Brenin) now translated by "King". With one exception they were not, and did not claim to be, rulers of all Wales. Wales, much like Ireland, usually had neither the political unity nor the sovereignty of other contemporary European kingdoms such as England and Scotland.

=== Kings of Wales or of Britain ===
Geoffrey of Monmouth's work of fantasy, the History of the Kings of Britain, achieved wide popularity from 1136. It has no independent value as history, but it produced a list of legendary kings of Britain that remains influential.

==== Gruffydd ap Llywelyn ====
Map of the kingdom of Gruffydd ap Llywelyn Wales

The modern territory of Wales was briefly united under the rule of Gruffydd (or Gruffudd) ap Llywelyn from 1055 to 1063. Gruffydd was "the only Welsh king ever to rule over the entire territory of Wales... Thus, from about 1057 until his death in 1063, the whole of Wales recognised the kingship of... Gruffudd ap Llywelyn". Some modern authors have applied to Gruffydd the title of King of Wales. "In 1055 he conquered Deheubarth as well, thus becoming in effect King of Wales". The later Brut y Tywysogion described him as being "the head and shield of the Britons". John of Worcester referred to him, several decades later, as Rex Walensium, King of the Welsh.

After Gruffydd's betrayal and death at the hands of his own men, Wales again became disunited, and was reunited only by the Conquest of Wales by Edward I.

==== Owain Gwynedd ====
The title King of Wales was later used by Owain Gwynedd (c. 1100–1170), who actually ruled only Gwynedd. In his first two letters to Louis VII of France, Owain described himself as "king of Wales" and "king of the Welsh". Nevertheless, his last letter to Louis used the title Princeps. Owain was also the first to claim the title of Prince of Wales.

=== Prince of Wales ===
Since the death of Owain Glyndŵr in 1415, the title of Prince of Wales has only been held by non-native heirs to the English (and later British) monarchy.

== See also ==
- List of rulers in Wales – Medieval Welsh realms and their rulers
- Hywel Dda – King of Gwynedd from 942 to 950
