= Bleddyn ap Cynfyn =

King of Gwynedd from 1063 to 1075

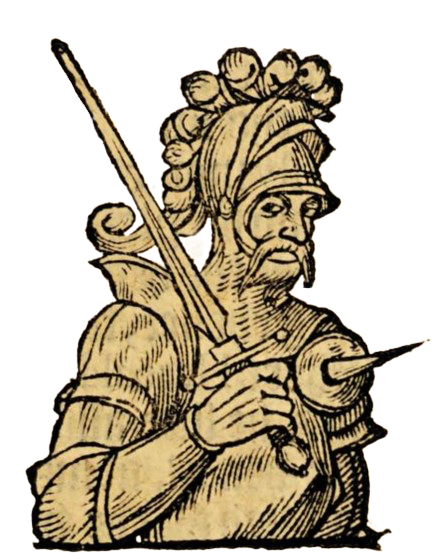
- A fanciful illustration of Bleddyn ap Cynfyn from the Historie of Cambria (1584)

King of Gwynedd
- Reign: 1063–1075
- Predecessor: Gruffydd ap Llywelyn
- Successor: Trahaearn ap Caradog

King of Powys
- Reign: 1063–1075
- Predecessor: Gruffydd ap Llywelyn
- Successor: Iorwerth ap Bleddyn
- Died: 1075
- Spouse: Haer ferch Gillyn
- House: Mathrafal
- Father: Cynfyn ap Gwerystan
- Mother: Angharad ferch Maredudd ap Owain

Coat of arms of Bleddyn ap Cynfyn (Gwynedd and Powys)

Bleddyn ap Cynfyn (Middle Welsh: Bledẏnt uab Kẏnỽẏn; (died 1075), sometimes spelled Blethyn, was an 11th-century Welsh king. King Harold Godwinson and Tostig Godwinson installed Bleddyn and his brother, Rhiwallon, as the co-rulers of the kingdom of Gwynedd on his father's death in 1063, during their destruction of the kingdom of their half-brother, king Gruffydd ap Llywelyn. Bleddyn became king of Powys and co-ruler of the Kingdom of Gwynedd with his brother Rhiwallon from 1063 to 1075. His descendants continued to rule Powys as the House of Mathrafal.

== Background ==
Bleddyn was born to a poorly documented Powys nobleman named Cynfyn ap Gwerystan, known only from the late traditional pedigrees reporting Bleddyn's parentage. Cynfyn's claimed father, Gwerstan or Gwerystan, is given contradictory Welsh pedigrees consisting mostly of otherwise unknown names, a possibly spurious derivation since his name perhaps actually represents a rendering of the Anglo-Saxon name Werestan.

Cynfyn, likely a supporter of King Llywelyn ap Seisyll, would after the latter's 1023 death marry the widowed queen, Angharad, daughter of King Maredudd ab Owain of Dyfed, member of the House of Dinefwr, whose realm had been lost to the Irish pretender Rhain before its conquest by Llywelyn.

Angharad and Cynfyn had at least two sons, Bleddyn and Rhiwallon, probably born in the late 1020s, who were thus maternal half-brothers of Gruffydd ap Llywelyn, Angharad's son by her first husband. Gruffydd, aged about ten and passed over for succession at the time of his father's death, slowly rebuilt his father's realm, annexing its successor states.

Cynfyn and Rhiwallon first appear in the documentary record in 1063. Bleddyn may have been residing in Powys, where he married Haer ferch Cillyn, daughter of the Lord of Gest Cillyn y Blaidd Rudd ("Cillyn the Red Wolf").

== Reign ==
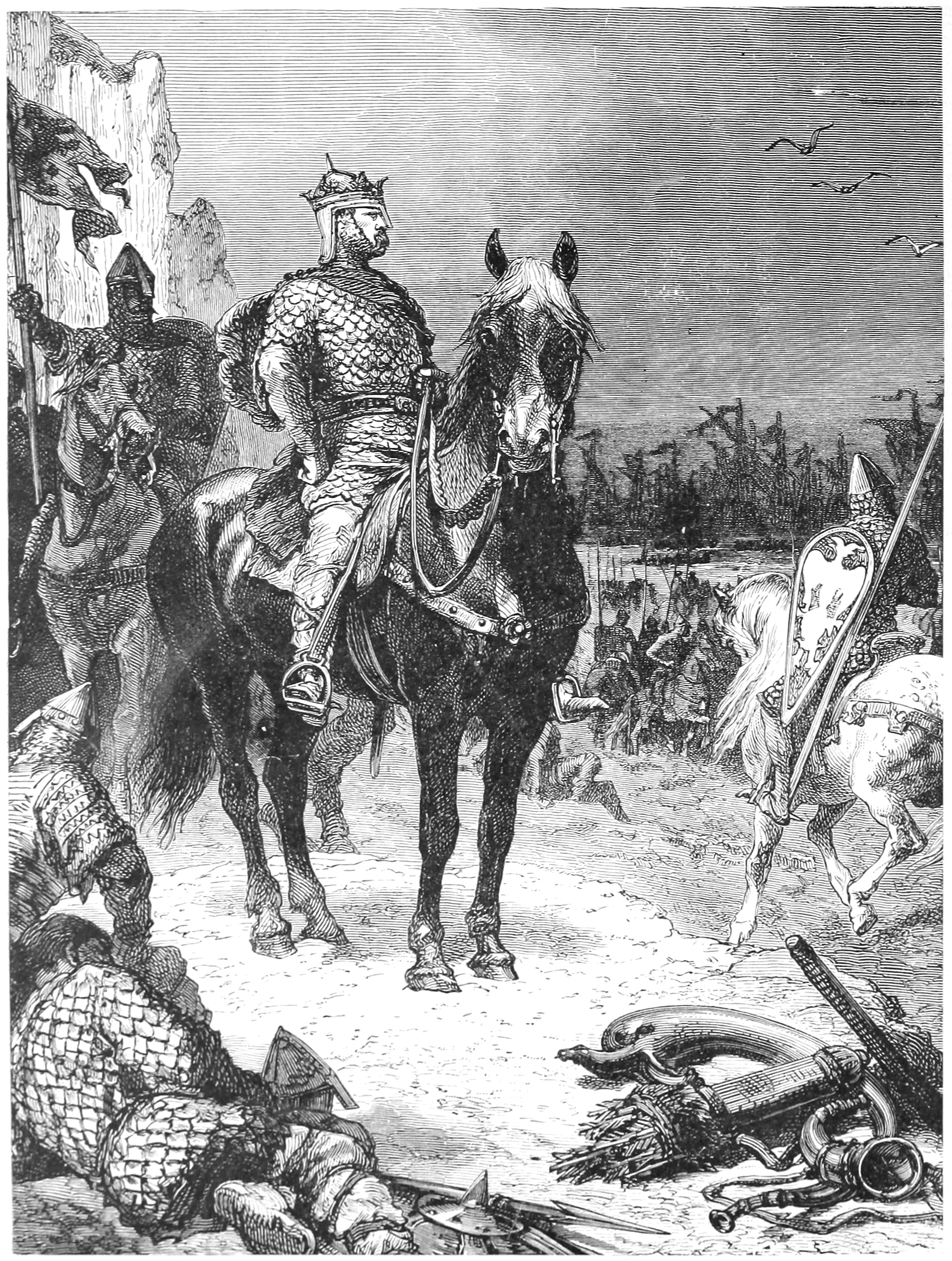
William the Conqueror invades England, engraving of the new king after the Battle of Hastings, 1066.

Gruffydd's consolidation of power and alliance with earl Ælfgar of Mercia made him a threat to Harold Godwinson, earl of Hereford. Upon Ælfgar's death in 1062, Harold and his brother Tostig quickly invaded; the following year, they invaded again and were left in mastery of Wales after traitors among his men killed Gruffydd during a retreat. The south was restored to the Houses of Dinefwr and Morgan, but Powys and Gwynedd were given to Gruffydd's half-brothers Bleddyn and Rhiwallon. These two submitted to Harold and swore themselves vassals and allies of Edward the Confessor. (Note: K. L. Maund is of the opinion that Bleddyn ruled Gwynedd and Rhiwallon Powys.)

At the time of the Norman Conquest, Bleddyn was the most powerful king in Wales. Closely allied with Harold, the brothers joined the Saxon resistance to William the Conqueror following his conquest of England. In 1067, they joined the Mercian Eadric the Wild in their struggle against William and attacked the Normans at Hereford, ravaging the lands as far as the River Lugg. In 1068, they joined earls Edwin of Mercia and Morcar of Northumbria in their attacks as well. The earls both later submitted to William.

In 1070, King Gruffydd's sons, Idwal ap Gruffydd and Prince Maredudd ap Gruffydd, challenged Bleddyn. Rhiwallon, Idwal and Maredudd all died in the Battle of Mechain. Bleddyn was the king of both Gwynedd and Powys.

In 1073, Robert of Rhuddlan stealthily established his forces on the banks of the River Clwyd and attempted to ambush and capture Bleddyn. He narrowly failed but seized valuable booty in raids further south. Bleddyn was killed in 1075 by King Rhys ab Owain of Deheubarth, having been betrayed by the lords of Ystrad Tywi.

When Rhys was later defeated at the 1078 Battle of Goodwick (or Pwllgwdig) by Bleddyn's successor, Trahaearn ap Caradog, and killed by Caradog ap Gruffydd of Gwent shortly afterwards, this was hailed as vengeance "for the blood of Bleddyn ap Cynfyn, his first cousin". After his death, Gwynedd was seized by Trahaearn and later recovered for the House of Aberffraw by Gruffudd ap Cynan; but in Powys, Bleddyn was the founder of a dynasty which lasted until the end of the 13th century.

== Legacy ==
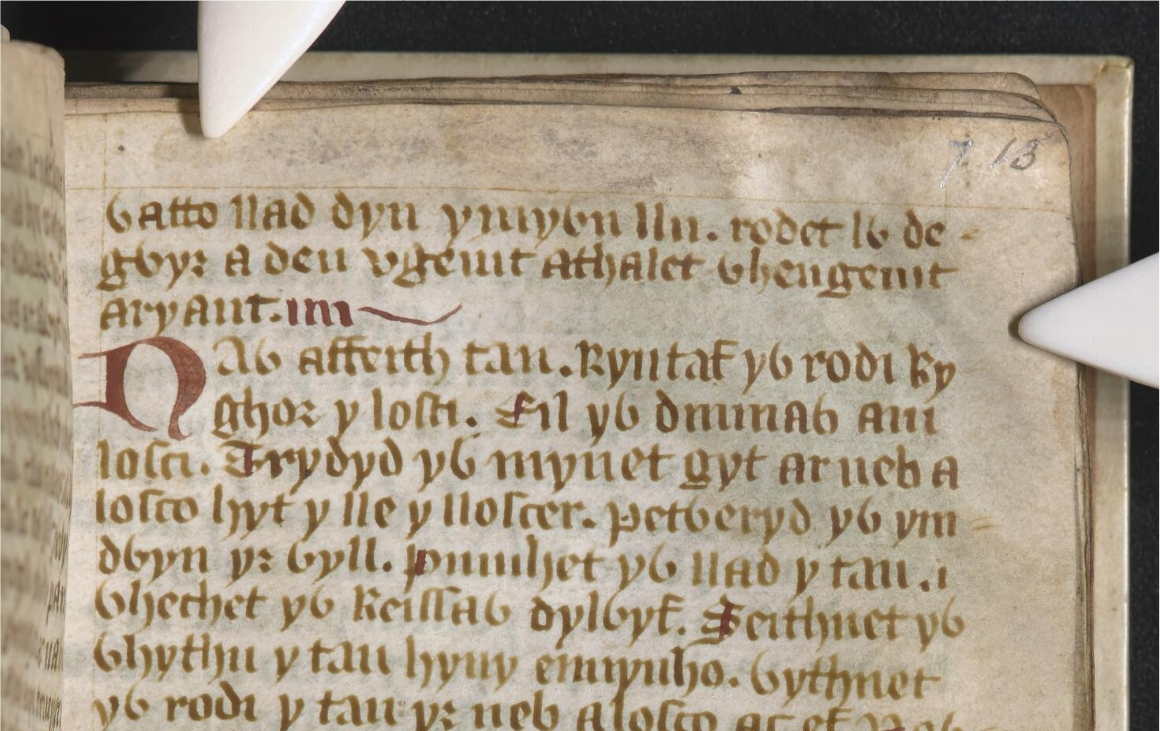
Extract from the Chronicle of the Princes in which Bleddyn is featured during his reign.

Bleddyn's legacy in the Chronicle of the Princes was that of a benevolent ruler:

"The most lovable and the most merciful of all kings... he was civil to his relatives, generous to the poor, merciful to pilgrims and orphans and widows and a defender of the weak... the mildest and most clement of kings... [he] did injury to none, save when insulted... openhanded to all, terrible in war, but in peace beloved".

Bleddyn was also responsible for a revision of the Welsh law which continued in force in his dynasty's domain of Powys. Gwynedd's Venedotian Code noted that he changed the legal composition of the homestead (tyddyn) for purposes of inheritance etc., varying its size depending on the social status of the owner. The homestead of a nobleman (uchelwr) was 12 Welsh acres, that of a serf (Medieval Welsh eẏllt, Modern Welsh aillt) had 8, and that of a bondsman or slave (Medieval godaẏauc) had 4. (The text, however, notes the uncommonness of this division and says it was generally understood as 4 acres regardless of status.)

== Children ==
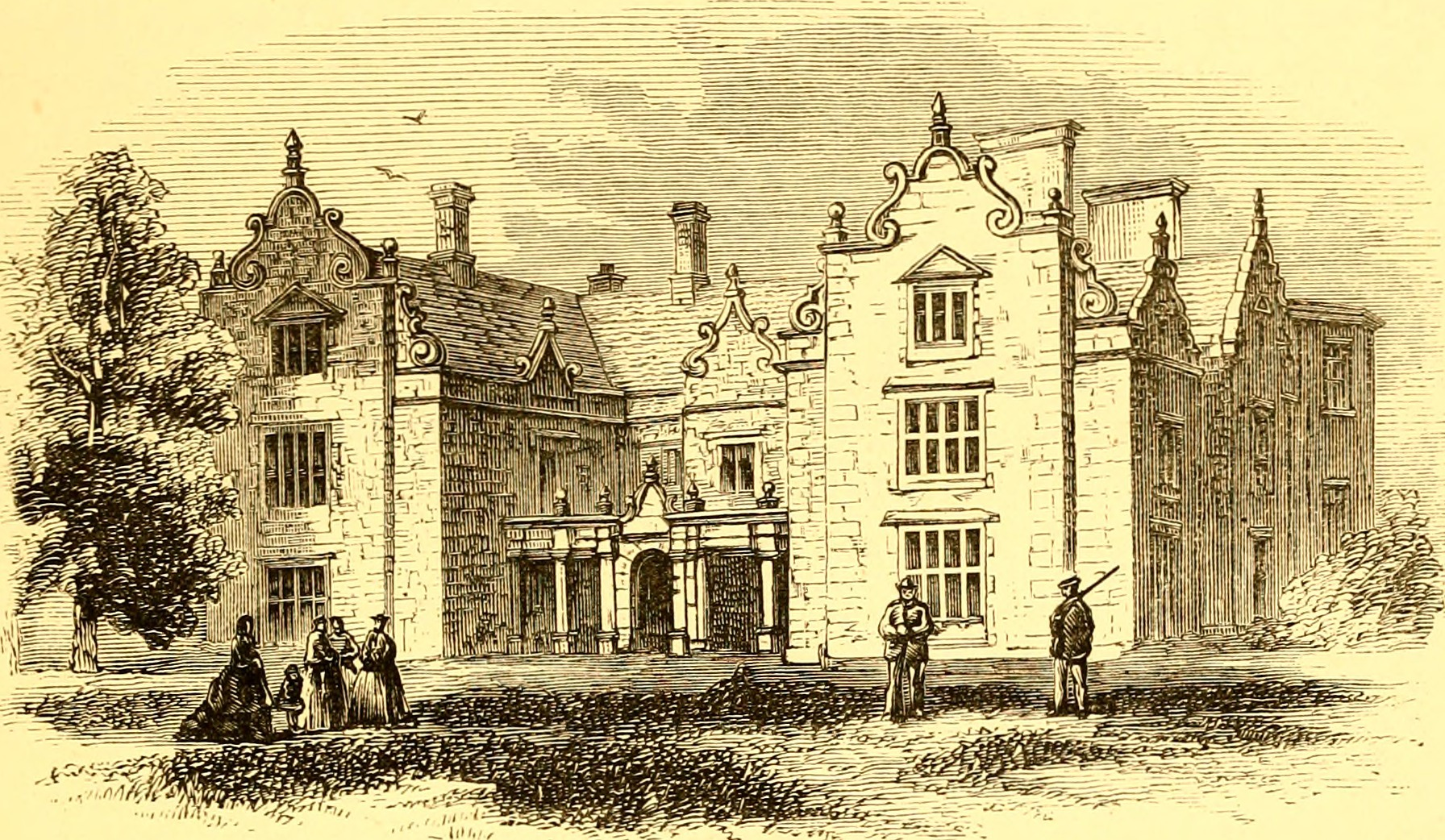
Llanrhaiadr Hall, seat of the Parrys of Llwynynn, from an estate inherited from Bleddyn ap Cynfyn

Bleddyn had at least five children: They continued to rule the House of Powys.

- Maredudd (d. 1132), king of Powys;
- Cadwgan (d. 1111), prince of Powys;
- Madog;
- Rhirid (1049–1088), king of Powys;
- Iorwerth (d. 1111), prince of Powys.

== Family ==
Bleddyn's sister Iwerydd married prince Edwin of Tegeingl. They became the parents of prince Owain of Tegeingl, who sided with the Normans Hugh d'Avranches, Earl of Chester, and Hugh of Montgomery, 2nd Earl of Shrewsbury, member of William the Conqueror's family.

Bleddyn's grandniece, queen Angharad, married the Welsh king Gruffudd ap Cynan, a great-grandson of the Norse king Sigtrygg Silkbeard, member of the Viking Ivar dynasty. They became the parents of the first prince of Wales, Owain Gwynedd, and of prince Cadwaladr, who married a daughter of the Norman baron Richard Fitz Gilbert de Clare, a cousin of William the Conqueror through his great-grandfather, Gilbert, Count of Brionne.

Their daughter, the warrior princess Gwenllian, became the mother of Lord Rhys, prince of Wales, the daughter-in-law of king Rhys ap Tewdwr, who made an alliance with William the Conqueror, and the sister-in-law of princess Nesta. Nesta was Bleddyn's grandniece, and became the founder, with her husband Gerald de Windsor, of the Fitzgerald dynasty of Ireland.

== Sources ==
- Maund, Kari (2014), The Welsh Kings: Warriors, Warlards and Princes, The History Press, ISBN 978-0-7524-2973-1.
- Davies, R. R. (1991), The age of conquest: Wales 1063–1415, Oxford University Press, ISBN 0-19-820198-2.
- Jones, Thomas Jones, ed. (1952), Brut y Tywysogyon: Peniarth MS. 20 version, University of Wales Press.
- Owen, Aneurin, ed. (1841), "The Venedotian Code", Ancient Laws and Institutes of Wales; Comprising Laws Supposed to be Enacted by Howel the Good, Modified by Subsequent Regulations under the Native Princes prior to the Conquest by Edward the First: And Anomalous Laws, Consisting Principally of Institutions which by the Statute of Ruddlan were Admitted to Continue in Force: With an English Translation of the Welsh Text, to which are Added A few Latin Transcripts, Containing Digests of the Welsh Laws, Principally of the Dimetian Code, London: Commissioners on the Public Records of the Kingdom, (in Welsh) and (in English)
- Powel, David (1584). The historie of Cambria, now called Wales: a part of the most famous Yland of Brytaine, written in the Brytish language aboue two hundreth yeares past. Translated by Llwyd, Humphrey. London: Rafe Newberrie and Henrie Denham. IA historieofcambri00cara.
- Pryce, Huw. "Bleddyn ap Cynfyn (d. 1075), king of Gwynedd and of Powys". Oxford Dictionary of National Biography (online ed.). Oxford University Press. doi:10.1093/ref:odnb/48537. (Subscription, Wikipedia Library access or UK public library membership required.)

Bleddyn ap Cynfyn House of Mathrafal Born: Unknown Died: 1075
Regnal titles
Preceded by Gruffydd ap Llywelyn	King of Gwynedd and Powys; 1063–1075	Succeeded by Trahaearn ap Caradog (Gwynedd); Iorwerth ap Bleddyn (Powys)
