= Gruffudd ap Llywelyn =

King of Wales from 1055 to 1063

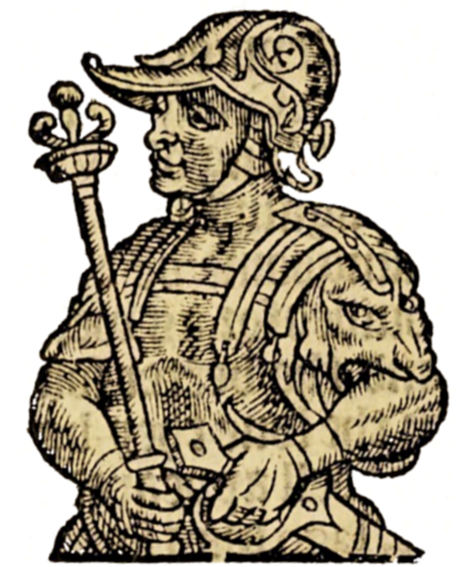
- A fanciful illustration of Gruffudd ap Llywelyn from the Historie of Cambria (1584)

King of Wales
- Reign: 1055–1063

King of Gwynedd and of Powys
- Reign: 1039–1055
- Predecessor: Iago ab Idwal ap Meurig
- Successor: Bleddyn ap Cynfyn
- Born: c. 1010; Rhuddlan, Kingdom of Gwynedd
- Died: 5 August 1063 (aged 52–53); Snowdonia, Wales
- Spouse: Edith of Mercia Former wife of Hywel ab Edwin
- Issue: Maredudd ap Gruffudd; Idwal ap Gruffudd; Nesta ferch Gruffudd; Owain ap Gruffudd; Cynan ap Gruffudd
- Father: Llywelyn ap Seisyll
- Mother: Angharad ferch Maredudd

Gruffudd ap Llywelyn (c. 1010 – 5 August 1063) was the only Welsh king to unite all of Wales, ruling from 1055 to 1063. He had previously been King of Gwynedd and Powys from 1039 to 1055. Gruffudd was the son of Llywelyn ap Seisyll, King of Gwynedd, and Angharad, daughter of Maredudd ab Owain, King of Deheubarth, and the great-great-grandson of Hywel Dda. After his death, Wales was again divided into separate kingdoms.

== Genealogy and early life ==
Gruffudd was the son of Llywelyn ap Seisyll, who had been able to rule both Gwynedd and Powys, and of Angharad ferch Maredudd. On Llywelyn's death in 1023, a member of the House of Aberffraw, Iago ab Idwal ap Meurig, became ruler of Gwynedd and began his rise to power in Powys.

== King of Gwynedd and Powys (1039–1055) ==
In 1039, Iago, King of Gwynedd, was killed (supposedly by his own men), his son Cynan was forced into exile in Dublin, and Gruffudd was made King. Soon after gaining power, he surprised a Mercian army at Rhyd y Groes near Welshpool and defeated it, killing Edwin, brother of Leofric, Earl of Mercia. He then attacked Dyfed, which his father had ruled but which was now under Hywel ab Edwin. Gruffudd again defeated Hywel in the Battle of Pencader in 1041 (halfway between Carmarthen and Lampeter but did not win entirely until 1042 at "Pwlldyfach" (near Carmarthen) and carried off Hywel's wife. Gruffudd seems to have been able to drive Hywel (and his Irish fleet of "Black Gentiles / Pagans") out of the south, for in 1044 Hywel is again recorded returning to the River Towy with a fleet from Ireland; Gruffudd, however, defeated and killed Hywel.

Gruffudd ap Rhydderch of Gwent was able to expel Gruffudd ap Llywelyn from Deheubarth in 1047 and became King of Deheubarth himself. Afterwards the nobles of Ystrad Tywi had attacked and killed 140 of Gruffudd ap Llywelyn's household guards, Gruffudd exacted his revenge in Towy and Dyfed. Gruffudd ap Llywelyn was active on the Welsh border in 1052 when he attacked Herefordshire with an army consisting of a fleet of 18 ships from Ireland; they defeated a mixed force of Normans and Anglo-Saxons in the Battle of Leominster.

== Ruler of all Wales (1055–1063) ==
Map of the extent of Gruffudd ap Llywelyn's Conquest Gwynedd, Gruffudd ap Llywelyn's kingdom

According to Brut y Tywysogion, Sweyn Godwinson was called in to help Gruffudd's brother Rhys against Gruffudd ap Rhydderch in 1045 to keep hold of Deheubarth. Gruffudd raided Leominster in 1052, resulting in the Battle of Llanllieni, the Welsh fighting against Normans and Anglo-Saxons.

In 1055 Gruffudd ap Llywelyn killed his rival Gruffudd ap Rhydderch in battle and recaptured Deheubarth. Gruffudd allied himself with Ælfgar, son of Leofric, Earl of Mercia, who had been deprived of his earldom of East Anglia by Harold Godwinson and his brothers. They marched on Hereford and were opposed by a force led by the Earl of Hereford, Ralph the Timid. mounted and armed in the Norman fashion, but on 24 October 1055 Gruffudd and Ælfgar defeated it. They then sacked the city, burned it, and destroyed its motte-and-bailey castle. Earl Harold was given the task of counter-attacking, but Gruffudd and Ælfgar had retreated to South Wales whilst Harold ventured no further than Hereford. He seems here to have built a fortification at Longtown in Herefordshire before refortifying Hereford. Shortly afterwards, Ælfgar was restored to his earldom and a peace treaty was concluded.

Around this time Gruffudd was also able to seize Morgannwg and Gwent, along with extensive territories along the border with England.

The historian John Davies stated that Gruffudd was:

The only Welsh king ever to rule over the entire territory of Wales... Thus, from about 1057 until his death in 1063, the whole of Wales recognised the kingship of Gruffudd ap Llywelyn. For about seven brief years, Wales was one, under one ruler, a feat with neither precedent nor successor.

During this time, between 1053 and 1063, Wales lacked any internal strife and was at peace. The later Brut y Tywysogion described him as being "the head and shield of the Britons". John of Worcester referred to him, several decades later, as Rex Walensium, 'King of the Welsh'.

== Death and aftermath ==
Gruffudd reached an agreement with Edward the Confessor, but the death of his ally Ælfgar in 1062 left him more vulnerable. In late 1062 Harold Godwinson obtained the English king's approval for a surprise attack on Gruffudd's court at Rhuddlan. Gruffudd was nearly captured, but was warned in time to escape out to sea in one of his ships, though his other ships were destroyed. In the spring of 1063 Harold's brother Tostig Godwinson led an army into North Wales while Harold led the fleet first to south Wales and then north to meet his brother's army. Gruffudd was forced to take refuge in Snowdonia, where he met his death. Gruffudd's head and the figurehead of his ship were sent to Harold. The Ulster Chronicle states that he was killed in 1064 by Cynan, whose father Iago had been put to death by Gruffudd in 1039. (Note: Compare Remfry, P. M.; Annales Cambriae, 68 and notes) Gruffudd had probably made enemies in the course of uniting Wales under his rule. According to Walter Map, Gruffudd said of this:

"Speak not of killing; I but blunt the horns of the offspring of Wales lest they should injure their dam."

Following Gruffudd's death, Harold married his widow Ealdgyth, who was to be widowed again three years later. Gruffudd's realm was divided again into the traditional kingdoms. Gruffudd's half-brothers, Bleddyn ap Cynfyn and his brother Rhiwallon, came to an agreement with Harold and were given the rule of Gwynedd and Powys. Thus when Harold was defeated and killed at the Battle of Hastings in 1066, the Normans reaching the borders of Wales were confronted by the traditional kingdoms rather than a single king. Gruffudd left two sons who in 1069 challenged Bleddyn and Rhiwallon at the Battle of Mechain in an attempt to win back part of their father's kingdom. However, they were defeated, one being killed and the other dying of exposure after the battle.

== Family ==
Gruffudd married Ealdgyth, daughter of Ælfgar, Earl of Mercia after he abducted, and married, the wife (name unknown) of Hywel ab Edwin in 1041. Gruffudd had at least three children: two sons called Maredudd and Idwal, both of whom died at the Battle of Mechain in 1069, and a daughter, Nest ferch Gruffudd, who married Lord Osbern fitzRichard. His widow, Ealdgyth, later became the Queen Consort of England of Harold Godwinson, with the latter becoming the step-father of Gruffudd's children.

Gruffudd's granddaughter, Nest ferch Osbern (Nesta of Hereford), married Bernard de Neufmarché, the first Norman Conqueror of Wales, and they became the parents of Countess Sibyl de Neufmarché, mother of Roger FitzMiles, 2nd Earl of Hereford, and grandmother of Humphrey III de Bohun, who married Scottish princess Margaret of Huntingdon, Duchess of Brittany. Gruffudd may have had another son, Owain ap Gruffudd, who died in 1059.

== Sources ==
- Evans, Gwynfor (1974). Land of My Fathers: 2000 Years of Welsh History. Y Lolfa. p. 156. ISBN 9780862432652.
- "BBC Wales - History - Themes - Welsh unity".
- Stephen, Leslie; Lee, Sidney, eds. (1890). "Gruffydd ab Llewelyn (d.1063)" . Dictionary of National Biography. Vol. 23. London: Smith, Elder & Co. pp. 305–307.
- Lloyd, John Edward (1911). A History of Wales, from the Earliest Times to the Edwardian Conquest. Vol. II (Reprint Vol. 2 of 2 ed.). Longmans, Green & Co. ISBN 978-1-334-06136-3.
- Jones, Thomas (1959). "GRUFFUDD ap LLYWELYN (died 1063), king of Gwynedd and Powys, and after 1055 king of all Wales". Dictionary of Welsh Biography. National Library of Wales.
- Hudson, Benjamin (1959). "GRUFFUDD AP LLYWELYN (died 1064), king of Gwynedd 1039-1064 and overlord of all the Welsh 1055-1064". Dictionary of Welsh Biography. National Library of Wales.
- Maund, K. L. (1991). Ireland, Wales, and England in the Eleventh Century. Boydell & Brewer Ltd. ISBN 978-0-85115-533-3.
- Davies, John (1993). A History of Wales. London: Penguin. p. 100. ISBN 0-14-014581-8.
- "The National Archives - Exhibitions - Uniting the Kingdoms?".
- Powel, David (1584). The historie of Cambria, now called Wales: a part of the most famous Yland of Brytaine, written in the Brytish language aboue two hundreth yeares past. Translated by Llwyd, Humphrey. London: Rafe Newberrie and Henrie Denham. IA historieofcambri00cara.

Gruffudd ap Llywelyn
Regnal titles
Preceded by Iago ab Idwal ap Meurig	King of Gwynedd; 1039–1063	Succeeded by Bleddyn ap Cynfyn and Rhiwallon ap Cynfyn
Preceded by Iago ab Idwal ap Meurig	King of Powys; 1039–1063	Succeeded by Bleddyn ap Cynfyn and Rhiwallon ap Cynfyn
Preceded by Gruffudd ap Rhydderch	King of Morgannwg; 1055–1063	Succeeded by Cadwgan ap Meurig
Preceded by Gruffudd ap Rhydderch	King of Deheubarth; 1055–1063	Succeeded by Maredudd ab Owain ab Edwin
