= Cadwgan ap Bleddyn =

Welsh Prince of Powys and Gwynedd

Attributed arms of Cadwgan ap Bleddyn

Cadwgan ap Bleddyn (1051–1111) was a prince of the Kingdom of Powys (Welsh: Teyrnas Powys) in north eastern Wales. He (possibly born 1060) was the second son of Bleddyn ap Cynfyn who was king of both Kingdom of Powys and Gwynedd.

The Anglo-Saxon Chronicle stated: "the Welsh ... chose many leaders from among themselves, one of them was called Cadwgan, who was the finest of the all".

The Welsh ruling kingdoms had descended to civil strife during the Norman invasion of Wales. Bleddyn, Cadwgan's father was killed in 1075 in the 'battle of Gwdig' (Goodwick) by the neighboring kingdom of Deheubarth and Prince Rhys ab Owain with the nobles of Ystrad Tywi; his family avenged his death when his cousin Trahaearn ap Caradog retaliated in the battle of Goodwick. After this, the Kingdom of Powys was divided between three of Bleddyn's sons: Cadwgan, Iorwerth and Maredudd.

== Battles ==
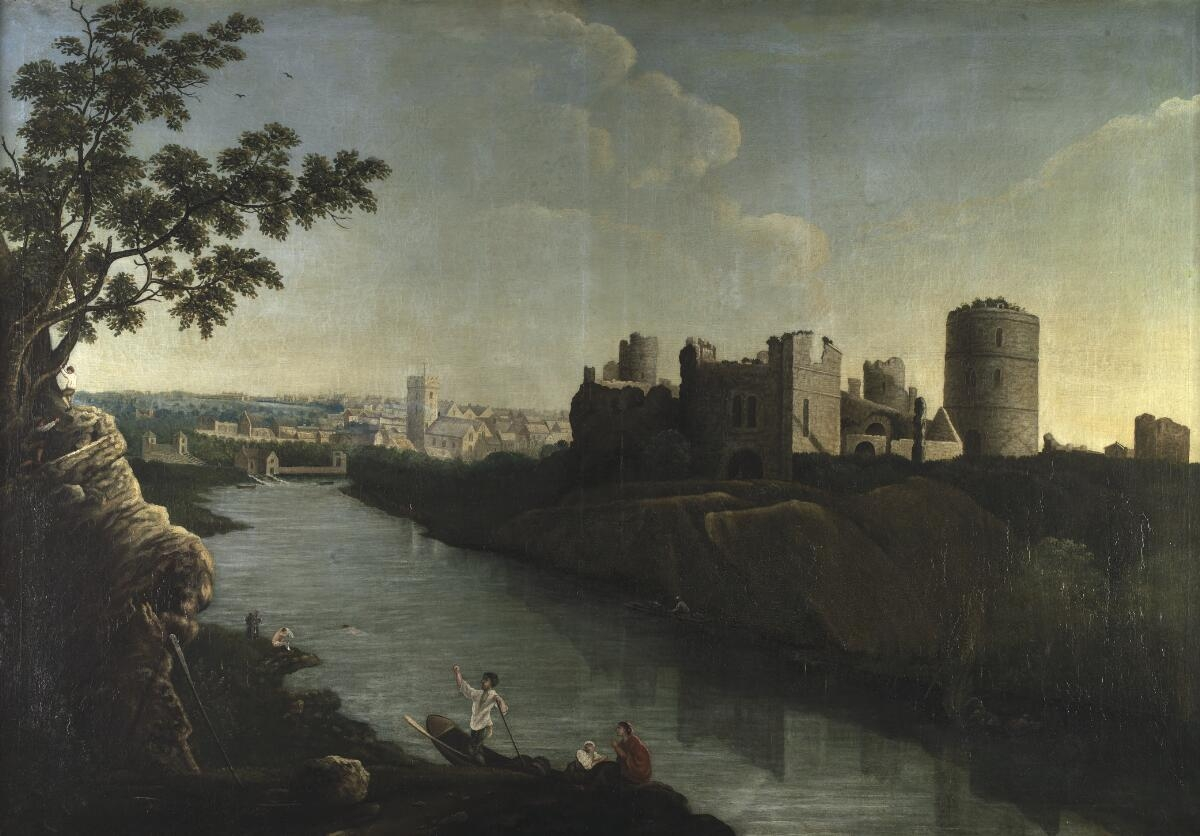
Pembroke Castle, attacked by Prince Cadwgan

Cadwgan is first heard of in 1088 when he attacked Deheubarth with Trahaern ap Caradog in retaliation for his father's death, forcing its king, Rhys ap Tewdwr, to flee to Ireland. However, Rhys returned later the same year with a fleet from Ireland and defeated the men of Powys in a battle in which two of Cadwgan's nephews, Madog and Rhiryd, were killed.

When Rhys ap Tewdwr was killed in 1093, Cadwgan again attacked Deheubarth, but it soon became clear that it was the Normans who would benefit from the death of Rhys. About this time Cadwgan married the daughter of one of the neighbouring Norman lords, Picot de Sai. By 1093, he had captured Montgomery Castle with his brothers during the insurrection, and with their allies, came close to capturing Pembroke Castle. In 1094 a Welsh revolt against Norman rule broke out, and Cadwgan played a part in this, defeating a Norman force at the battle of Coed Yspwys. Bleddyn was now an ally of Gruffudd ap Cynan, king of Gwynedd, and when Earl Hugh of Chester and Earl Hugh of Shrewsbury launched an invasion in 1098 to try to recover Anglesey for Hugh of Chester, Cadwgan was with Gruffydd. A Danish fleet hired by Gruffudd was offered a higher price by the Normans and changed sides, forcing Cadwgan and Gruffudd to flee to Ireland in a skiff.

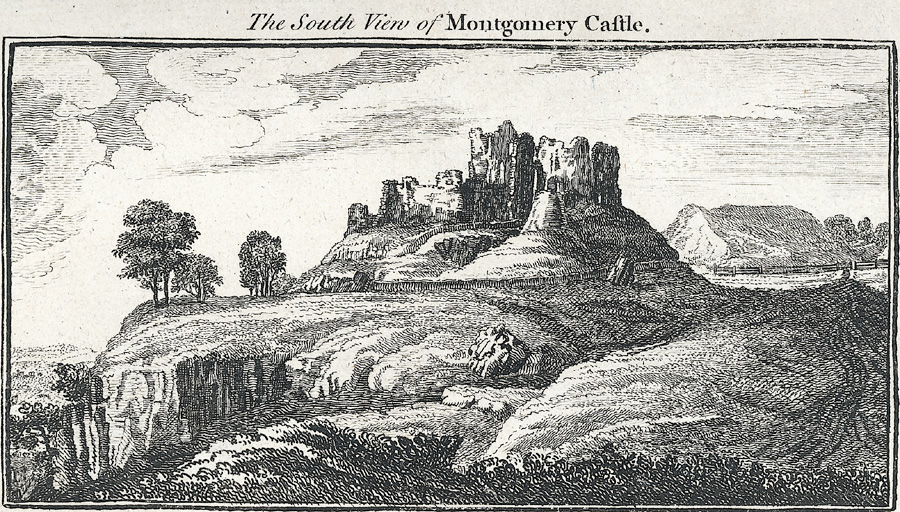
South view of Montgomery Castle, was captured by Cadwgan and his brothers

They were able to return to Wales the following year, and Cadwgan was able to reclaim part of Powys and Ceredigion, on condition of doing homage to Earl Robert of Shrewsbury. For a while Cadwgan was able to strengthen his position. Earl Robert fell out with the king in 1102 and was defeated with the assistance of Cadwgan's brother Iorwerth. Iorwerth took his other brother, Maredudd, captive and handed him over to the king. However, many of the lands which Iorwerth had been promised in exchange for his help were given to Norman lords instead, and Iorwerth broke with the king. In 1103 he was arraigned before a royal tribunal and imprisoned, leaving Cadwgan as sole ruler of the parts of Powys not in Norman hands. That same year he escaped the ruin of the Earl, and returned to his own lands.

== Family rule ==
In 1109, Cadwgan's son Owain ap Cadwgan fell in love with Nest, wife of Gerald of Pembroke and launched a daring raid on the castle of Cenarth Bychan to abduct her. Cadwgan tried to persuade his son to return Nest to her husband, but failed. The justiciar of Shropshire, Richard de Beaumais promised members of other branches of the ruling house of Powys extensive lands if they would join in an attack on Cadwgan and Owain. Ceredigion was invaded and Owain fled to Ireland, while Cadwgan made his peace with the king but was allowed to hold only one border vill. King Henry I of England later allowed him to have Ceredigion back on condition of paying a fine of £100 and promising to have nothing to do with Owain in future. When his brother Iorwerth was killed by his nephew Madog ap Rhiryd in 1111, Cadwgan again briefly took over the rule of all Powys, but later the same year Cadwgan himself was also killed by Madog at Welshpool (Welsh: Y Trallwng). Madog was able to seize some of his lands, while the remainder fell to his son Owain.

=== Descendants as Lord of Nannau ===
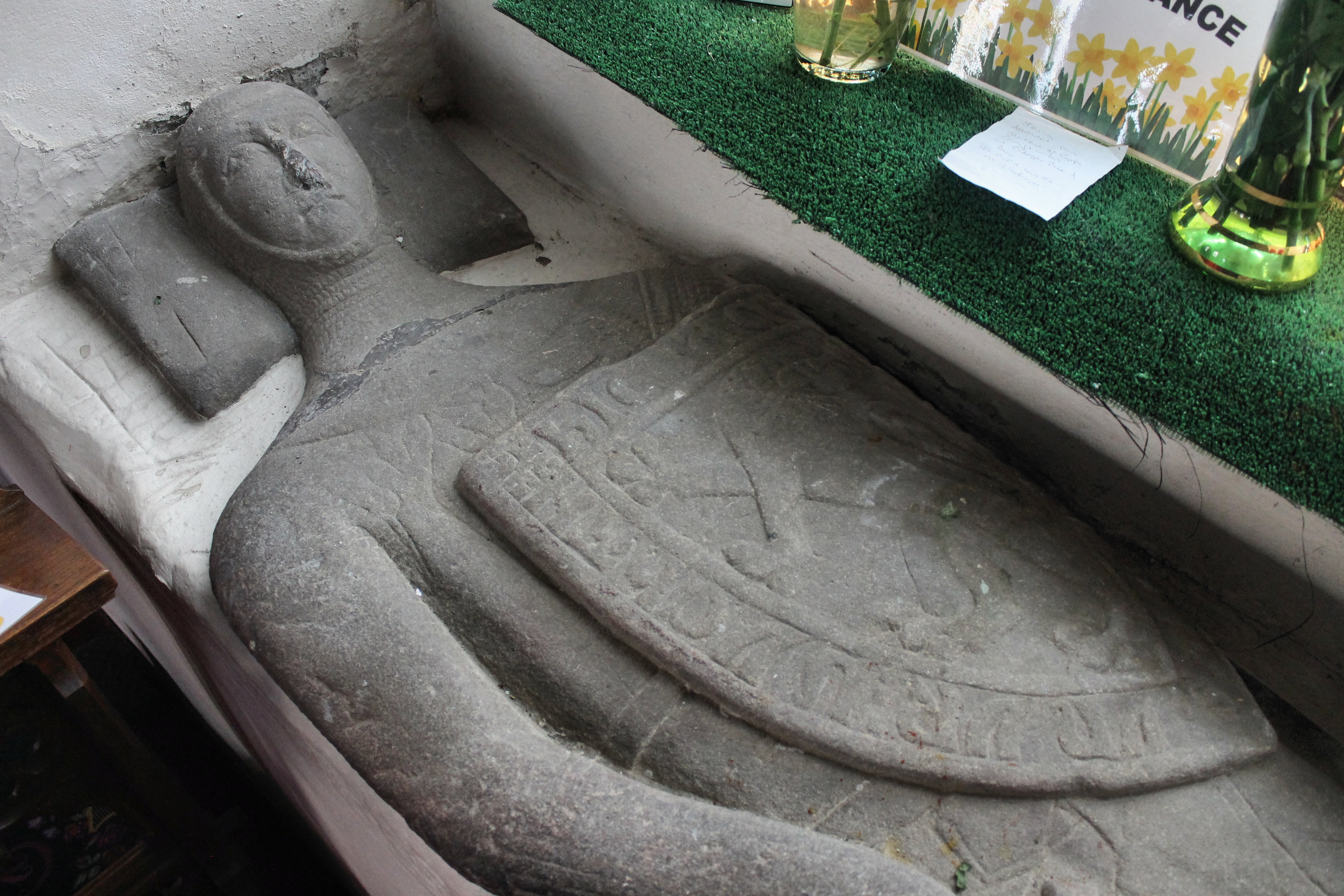
Effigy of Meurig ap Ynyr Fychan, of the Nannau branch

A son of Cadwgan, Madog ap Cadwgan had begun the Nannau family dynasty in the 12th century. Flourishing circa 1118–21, Madog became the 1st Lord of Nannau, Wales, and by 1116 was also the sole survivor of Cadwgan's sons. Cadwgan's grandson, Meurig ap Madog married Gwenllian, a daughter of Owain Gwynedd, King of Gwynedd. The title of Lord of Nannau continued until the 13th Lord in the 16th century. The direct descendants included: Hywel Sele, the cousin of Owain Glyndŵr, also Nannau, Nanney families as well as the cadet branches from the 16th century in the areas of Cefndeuddwr, Tywyn, Maesypandy and Llwyn in North Wales. Also, the Vaughan family members, and the Vaughan baronets (c. 1800). The Nannau family dynasty lands were passed on through inheritance for almost 900 years.

Cadwgan ap Bleddyn Mathrafal Dynasty Born: Unknown Died: 1103
Regnal titles
Preceded by Bleddyn ap Cynfyn	Prince of Powys (part); 1075–1111	Succeeded by Owain ap Cadwgan
