= Iorwerth ap Bleddyn =

Prince of Powys

Arms of Powys

Iorwerth ap Bleddyn (1053–1111) was a prince of Powys in eastern Wales. Iorwerth was the son of Bleddyn ap Cynfyn who was king of both Powys and Gwynedd. When Bleddyn was killed in 1075, Powys was divided between three of his sons, Iorwerth, Cadwgan and Maredudd.

Iorwerth, Cadwgan and Maredudd held their lands as vassals of Robert of Bellême, 3rd Earl of Shrewsbury. In 1102 the Earl was summoned to answer charges at the court of King Henry I of England and responded by rising in rebellion against the king. All three brothers initially supported Robert and took up arms on his behalf, pillaging Staffordshire. The king deputed William Pantulf to detach Iorwerth, who was considered to be the most powerful of the three brothers, from his alliance with Robert and his own brothers by the promise of large gifts of land. William succeeded in this, and Iorwerth led a large Welsh force to ravage Shropshire on behalf of the king. Robert was forced to surrender and was banished from the realm. Iorwerth also captured his brother Maredudd and handed him over to the king.

Iorwerth's support for the king did not last long however. Many of the lands which he had been promised were given to others, and in 1103 Iorwerth was arraigned before a royal tribunal at Shrewsbury, convicted and imprisoned. He was not released until 1110 after Owain ap Cadwgan, son of Iorwerth's brother Cadwgan, had abducted Nest wife of Gerald of Windsor resulting in an outbreak of hostilities. Iorwerth was able to drive Owain out of Powys and briefly regained his position as ruler. However, in 1111 Owain's ally, Madog ap Rhiryd, attacked Iorwerth at a house in which he was staying in the commote of Caereinion. Iorwerth's bodyguard was put to flight, the house set afire and Iorwerth was forced back at spearpoint into the burning building where he died. He left no heir, and when Cadwgan was also killed by Madog shortly afterwards, Owain ap Cadwgan took over the kingdom

Iorwerth ap Bleddyn Mathrafal Dynasty Born: Unknown Died: 1111
Regnal titles
Preceded by Bleddyn ap Cynfyn	Prince of Powys; 1075–1103	Succeeded by Cadwgan ap Bleddyn
