= Tripartite Indenture =

1405 agreement to divide England and Wales

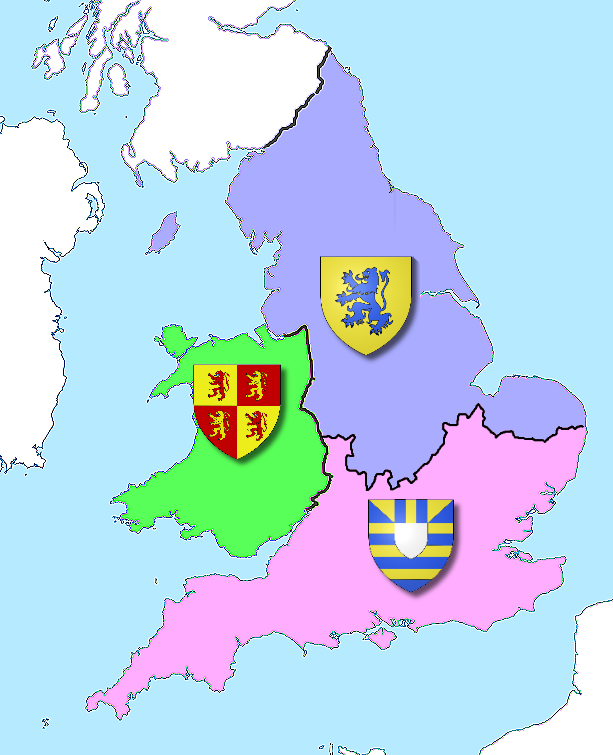
Division of England as agreed by the tripartite indenture

The Tripartite Indenture was an agreement made between Owain Glyndŵr, Edmund Mortimer, and Henry Percy, 1st Earl of Northumberland in February 1405, agreeing to divide England and Wales up among them at the expense of King Henry IV. Glyndŵr was to receive Wales and a substantial part of western England, including the English portions of the Welsh Marches. Percy was to receive Northern England, as well as Northamptonshire, Norfolk, Warwickshire, and Leicestershire. The Mortimers were to have received the rest of Southern England.

The agreement defined Glyndŵr's borders as follows:

The whole of Cambria or Wales divided from Leogria now commonly called England by the following borders, limits and bounds: From the Severn estuary as the River Severn flows from the sea as far as the northern gate of the city of Worcester; From that gate directly to the ash trees known in Cambrian or Welsh language as Onennau Meigion which grow on the high road from Bridgnorth to Kinver; Then directly along the highway, popularly known as the old or ancient road, to the head or source of the River Trent; Thence to the head or source of the river commonly known as the Mersey and so along that river to the sea.

The three sections approximately met at Onennau Meigion ('The Ashes of Meigion'), a point between Bridgnorth and Kinver where ash trees grew. A modern village called Six Ashes still exists at the approximate point on the Shropshire/Staffordshire border.

The Tripartite Indenture was the product of an alliance between the Glyndŵr, Percy, and Mortimer to overthrow Henry for their mutual benefit. Glyndŵr, the Prince of Wales, sought to exploit the situation to enlarge the Principality of Wales and enforce Welsh independence from England. Glyndŵr and many Welsh people resented Henry for having overthrown King Richard II, who was highly popular in Wales. Percy and Mortimer were high-ranking English noblemen but were disillusioned with the king due to personal gripes. Percy was upset that Henry forbade him from ransoming the Scottish lords captured at the Battle of Homildon Hill. Mortimer's nephew, Edmund Mortimer, 5th Earl of March, was the heir presumptive of Richard II and held in the captivity of Henry at the Tower of London. Glyndŵr and Mortimer formed an alliance with Percy, who rebelled in northern England, to fight against Henry. The partition was ultimately never realised because Percy was killed at the Battle of Bramham Moor in 1408, Mortimer died during the siege of Harlech Castle in 1409, and Glyndŵr was eventually defeated by Henry's son Henry V in 1415.

== See also ==
- Glyndŵr Rising
