= Maredudd ap Bleddyn =

King of Powys (died 1132)

Arms of Powys

Maredudd ap Bleddyn (d. 1132) was the founder of the resurrected Kingdom of Powys in eastern Wales. He was involved in the rebellions against Henry I of England (son of William the Conqueror who launched the Norman invasion of Wales). He was featured in the Brut y Tywysogion, and was succeeded by his son, Prince Madog ap Maredudd.

== Biography ==
Maredudd was the son of Bleddyn ap Cynfyn who was King of both Powys and Gwynedd. When Bleddyn was killed in 1075, Powys was divided between three of his sons, Iorwerth, Cadwgan and Maredudd. Maredudd married first Hunydd ferch Einudd, who bore him two sons, Madog ap Maredudd and Gruffydd ap Maredudd. He later had a relationship with Cristin ferch Bledrus, who gave him two illegitimate sons, Hywel ap Maredudd and Iorwerth Goch ap Maredudd.

Maredudd initially appears to have been the least powerful and the least mentioned in the chronicles. The three brothers held their lands as vassals of Robert of Bellême, 3rd Earl of Shrewsbury. In 1102 the Earl was summoned to answer charges at the court of King Henry I of England and responded by rising in rebellion against the king.

All three brothers initially supported Robert and took up arms on his behalf, pillaging Staffordshire. The king deputed William Pantulf, Lord of Wem, to detach Iorwerth, who was considered to be the most powerful of the three brothers, from his alliance with Robert and his own brothers by the promise of large gifts of land. William succeeded in this, and Iorwerth, after leading a large Welsh force to help the king defeat and banish Earl Robert, then captured his brother Maredudd and handed him over to the king.

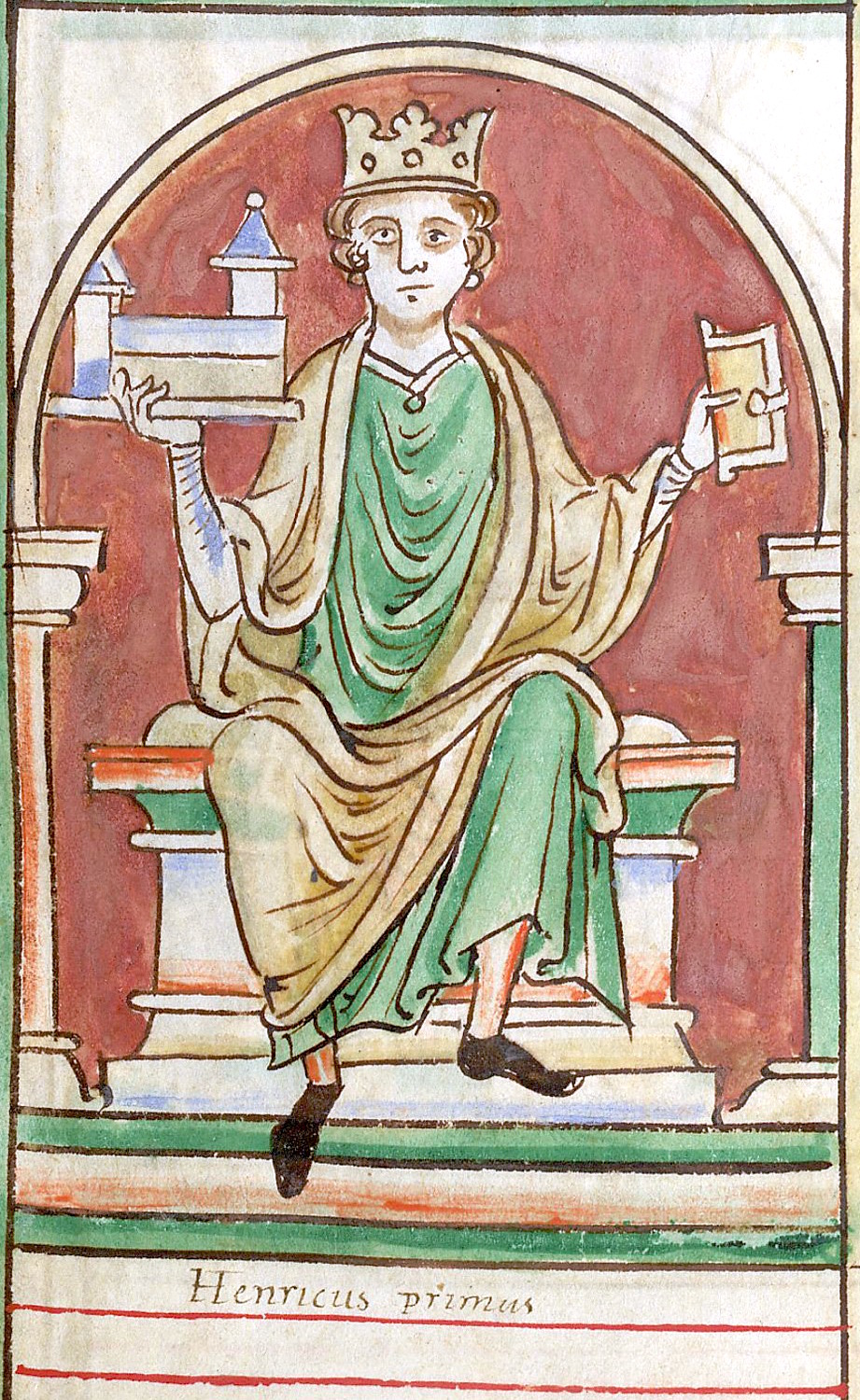
Henry I of England, son of William the Conqueror

Maredudd escaped from captivity in 1107 but did not gain any real power. In 1113 he was apparently acting as penteulu or captain of the guard to his nephew, Owain ap Cadwgan who had taken over as prince of Powys. In this capacity in 1113 Maredudd was able to capture Madog ap Rhiryd, who had killed two of his brothers, Iorwerth and Cadwgan in 1111. Maredudd sent him to Owain, who took vengeance for the killing of his father by blinding Madog.

== Later reign ==
In 1114 when King Henry I of England launched the Norman invasion of Wales, Maredudd quickly made his peace with him, while Owain allied himself with Gruffudd ap Cynan of Gwynedd to oppose the invasion. It was not until Owain was killed in 1116 that Maredudd began to strengthen his position and became ruler of Powys.

In 1116 he is recorded as sending 400 men to help Hywel ab Ithel, who ruled Rhos and Rhufoniog under the protection of Powys, against his neighbours, the sons of Owain ab Edwin of Dyffryn Clwyd. Hywel won a victory at the Battle of Maes Maen Cymro in 1118, near Ruthin, but received wounds of which he died six weeks later. This enabled the sons of Gruffudd ap Cynan to annex these lands for Gwynedd, with Maredudd unable to prevent them.

In 1121 Maredudd carried out raids on Cheshire which provoked King Henry into invading Powys. Maredudd retreated into Snowdonia and asked Gruffudd ap Cynan for assistance. However Gruffudd was in no mood to defy the king on Maredudd's behalf, and Maredudd had to purchase peace at a cost of a fine of 10,000 head of cattle. Gwynedd continued to put pressure on Powys, with the sons of Gruffudd ap Cynan, Cadwallon and Owain Gwynedd annexing more territory in 1124.

Cadwallon was killed in a battle with the men of Powys near Llangollen in 1132 which put a halt to further encroachment for the time being. Maredudd did not take part in this battle and died the same year, remembered by the annalist of Brut y Tywysogion as the beauty and safety of all Powys and her defender. He was succeeded by his son, Madog ap Maredudd.

Maredudd ap Bleddyn Mathrafal Dynasty Born: Unknown Died: 1132
Regnal titles
Preceded by New title	King of Powys c. 1124 – 1132	Succeeded by Madog ap Maredudd
