= William Pantulf =

12th-century Anglo-Norman baron

- Died: 16 April, probably in 1112
- Resting place: Noron Priory
- Occupation: baron
- Spouse: Lescelina
- Children: Philip; Robert; Ivo; Arnald
- Parent: Beatrice

William Pantulf (died 16 April probably in 1112) was an Anglo-Norman nobleman and Baron of Wem. He was born in Hiémois, a county of Normandy, where his family had lived since around 1030. Pantulf held lands in Shropshire following the Norman Conquest of England. A vassal of Roger of Montgomery, the Earl of Shrewsbury, Pantulf was accused of murdering Roger's wife but proved his innocence of the charge by a trial by ordeal. When Roger's son Robert of Belleme rebelled against King Henry I of England, Pantulf did not take part and sided with the king. Upon his death, which most likely occurred in 1112, William's eldest son, Philip, inherited his Norman lands, and his second son, Robert, received the English lands.

== Background and family ==
Pantulf was from Normandy. His family had lived there since at least around 1030, as a charter of Jumièges Abbey shows the family as vassals of the House of Montgomery in the Montgomery lands near Sées. (Note: The charter was granted by Roger de Montgomery, seigneur of Montgomery and was witnessed by a William Pantulf, but whether the William the witness and the later William were the same person is not known.) Pantulf's mother was named Beatrice, and his sister was named Helwise, but his father's name and other siblings are not known.

== After the Conquest ==
After the Norman Conquest of England, Pantulf held lands in Shropshire from Earl Roger de Montgomery. The earl settled a number of his Norman vassals, including Pantulf, on his new lands in Sussex and Shropshire. Pantulf was probably not present at the Battle of Hastings, likely due to Earl Roger's lack of participation in the campaign of conquest. Pantulf's grants totalled eleven manors located in Hodnet Hundred. Pantulf's lands in England were centered on Wem, and are considered a feudal barony, making Pantulf the first Baron of Wem. Although he had substantial lands in England, Pantulf continued to spend most of his time on the continent.

Pantulf was present at the consecration of the church at Bec Abbey on 23 October 1077, along with King William the Conqueror of England. Pantulf lost his lands temporarily because he was suspected of murdering Roger's wife Mabel de Bellême, around 1077. (Note: The actual murderer was Hugh Bunel, sometimes known as Hugh d'Igle.) Pantulf came under suspicion because Mabel had seized a castle at Peray en Saonnais held by Pantulf. When he was accused of the murder, Pantulf was in southern Italy, which had also been conquered by Normans. Pantulf sought refuge at the Abbey of Saint-Evroul in Normandy while he was under suspicion; he and his family were under the protection of the abbot.

Pantulf regained his lands after he cleared himself of the charge, through the mechanism of a trial by ordeal. (Note: One source gives the type of ordeal as being that of the hot iron.) It is not clear why the ordeal was required, with the historian David Bates speculating that either the evidence of Pantulf's involvement was not conclusive or that murder victim's family demanded the ordeal because they suspected any evidence pointing to Pantulf's innocence. Pantulf gave Saint-Evroul four altar frontals for the abbey's help after he was cleared of the charges.

By 1086 Pantulf held 29 manors in Shropshire, along with other lands in Staffordshire and Warwickshire. When Roger's son Robert de Bellême became Earl of Shrewsbury in 1098, Pantulf was once more deprived of those lands he held as a vassal of the Earl.

== Role in rebellion ==
In 1102, Robert de Bellême rebelled against King Henry I of England. Although Pantulf was still deprived of his previous holdings, he offered to support Robert but was rebuffed and instead supported the king. Henry placed Stafford Castle in Pantulf's custody. Besides controlling Stafford Castle, Pantulf mediated between Henry and some of the Welsh princes, who had previously sided with Robert, and helped secure their support for the king. Later, Pantulf again acted as an envoy for the king, being sent to secure the switch of sides of Robert's men who were holding Bridgnorth. Pantulf won their change of sides by offering the men lands worth 100 pounds on the king's behalf. His services to the king earned Pantulf the restoration of his confiscated estates as well as the grant of further lands—including the fief of Roger de Courcelles.

== Death and legacy ==
Pantulf married Lescelina, (Note: Her name is sometimes spelled Lesceline.) and they had four sons – Philip, Ivo, Arnald, and Robert. He and his wife founded Noron Priory, in 1073. This was located in Normandy and was founded as a small dependent priory of Saint Evroul. Besides Noron, Pantulf was also a benefactor of the Saint-Evroul. In 1092, Pantulf journeyed to southern Italy again, this time to secure a relic of Saint Nicholas for his foundation at Noron. (Note: The exact relic was a tooth, and Pantulf also brought back a piece of the saint's tomb.) During this visit, he was offered extensive lands in Apulia by Robert Guiscard, but declined the offer and returned to the north. Pantulf died on 16 April, probably in 1112, when his English lands were transferred to his second son Robert. The Norman lands went to the eldest son, Philip. Pantulf and his wife were buried at Noron in the cloister of his priory there.

Orderic Vitalis described Pantulf as "kind to the poor, to whom he was liberal in alms, he was firm in prosperity and adversity, put down all his enemies, and exercised great power through his wealth and possessions".
