= Owain ap Cadwgan =

Prince of Powys

Arms of Powys

Owain ap Cadwgan (died 1116) was a prince of Powys in eastern Wales. He is best known for his abduction of Nest, wife of Gerald of Windsor. Owain was the eldest son of Cadwgan ap Bleddyn, prince of part of Powys. He is first recorded in 1106, when he killed Meurig and Griffri, the sons of Trahaearn ap Caradog, who held lands in Arwystli.

In 1109 Owain's father Cadwgan gave a great feast at his court in Ceredigion, and at this feast Owain was told of the beauty of his second cousin Nest, whose husband Gerald held the castle of Cenarth Bychan (possibly Cilgerran Castle). He decided to visit Cenarth Bychan to see for himself, and having done so fell in love with Nest and determined to have her. It was also enticing that Nest was the daughter of the last King of Deheubarth. One night at Christmas 1109 Owain and fifteen companions burrowed underneath the gate to get into the castle then rushed in to abduct Nest and her children and set fire to the castle. Her husband, Gerald, fled through a garderobe. Nest is said by some to have borne Owain two sons, Llywelyn and Einion, before eventually being returned to her husband.

Owain's actions led to his father being confronted with an invasion, as the justiciar of Shropshire, Richard de Beaumais, promised the members of the cadet branches of the ruling house of Powys extensive lands if they would attack Cadwgan and Owain. Owain fled to Ireland while Cadwgan surrendered to King Henry I of England and lost all his lands. Ceredigion was later returned to Cadwgan, under the condition of paying a fine of £100 and promising to have nothing more to do with Owain.

Owain soon returned to Powys from Ireland and made an alliance with Madog ap Rhiryd. The king responded by releasing Owain's uncle, Iorwerth ap Bleddyn from captivity in 1110 and returning the rule of Powys to him. Owain was driven out of Powys by Iorwerth and retreated to Ceredigion, from where he made raids on Dyfed, selling his captives in the Irish slave markets. He also killed a prominent member of the Flemish colony, William of Brabant. King Henry responded by stripping Cadwgan of all his lands and forcing him to live as an exile in England, while Owain again fled to Ireland. However Iorwerth was killed by Owain's ally Madog ap Rhiryd in 1111 and the rule of Powys was returned to Cadwgan, who was allowed to recall Owain. When Cadwgan was also killed by Madog the same year, Owain became ruler of much of Powys. He employed his uncle Maredudd ap Bleddyn as penteulu (captain of the guard), and in 1113 Maredudd was able to capture Madog ap Rhiryd and sent him to Owain. Owain took vengeance for the killing of his father by blinding Madog.

In 1114 King Henry invaded Wales, an attack mainly aimed against Gruffudd ap Cynan of Gwynedd. Owain allied himself with Gruffudd, and retreated with him to Gwynedd. After peace terms had been agreed, Henry took Owain with him when he visited Normandy later that year and knighted him. Owain returned with the king in 1115 and in 1116 took to arms to assist King Henry in putting down the rebellion of Gruffydd ap Rhys of Deheubarth. Gerald of Windsor, husband of Nest, was fighting on the same side, and took the opportunity for vengeance, attacking Owain when he had only ninety men with him and killing him. Most of Powys now passed to his uncle, Maredudd.

Owain ap Cadwgan Mathrafal Dynasty
Regnal titles
Preceded by Cadwgan ap Bleddyn	Prince of Powys (part); 1111–1116	Succeeded by Maredudd ap Bleddyn
