= Jones of Hendwr =

Welsh noble family

- Arms of the Jones of Hendwr family
- Parent house: House of Mathrafal
- Country: Wales
- Founded: 16th century (when the surname was fixed)
- Titles: Baron of Hendwr
- Motto: Laus Deo

The Jones of Hendwr, and later Faerdref Uchaf, family is a Welsh gentry family from the parish of Llandrillo-yn-Edeirnion, Merionethshire, descended from the 4th Baron of Hendwr. 'Yr Hendwr' means 'the Old Tower' in Welsh and is visually represented by the crest of the Jones of Hendwr family.

When Thomas de Hendwr, 6th Baron of Hendwr, died on 26 October 1432, the barony of Hendwr was divided between his first cousins, the sons of Giwn Lloyd (d. 1425). The elder son Dafydd, who succeeded as 7th Baron, had the half of Hendwr centred on the caput of the Barony. The younger son Ieuan ap Giwn Lloyd inherited the other half of the barony centred on the nearby house of Faerdre Ucha or Ty Ucha.

The eponymous ancestor of the family was John ap Rhydderch ap Ieuan, of Hendwr, who appears in the visitations of Wales in 1594. His son, Maurice Jones of Faerdref Uchaf, Esq. (1597- ca. 1655), was the first to adopt the surname 'Jones'. In 1652, Nathanael Jones, who had inherited from his father half of the manor of Hendwr, married Mary Wynn, the 15th Baroness of Hendwr and the heiress of the other half of the manor of Hendwr. In this way the Hendwr estate was reunited and this was celebrated in several poems. This union was short-lived as the estate eventually passed to Nathanael's great-grandson, Giwn Lloyd, after whose death the Passingham family tricked his elderly sisters into signing away the Hendwr estate.

The family, like their kinsmen, were Royalists during the English Civil War and Lt. Nathanael Jones, fought at the Battle of Marston Moor, leading a company of men from Llandrillo. Later, Nathanael achieved minor fame as a native Welsh poet and translator of theological textbooks, such as works by Jeremy Taylor from English into Welsh, so that they could be more widely read. He also served as a Justice of the Peace and coroner for Merionethshire, and became High Sheriff of Merionethshire in 1673. His son, Maurice, also served as High Sheriff in 1684.

Descendants of Nathanael's younger brother, John Jones of Ty Ucha (d.1705) continued to hold land in the barony of Hendwr until it was all sold in 1840s and the family moved to Cheshire.

As descendants of Owain Brogyntyn, they bear the 'Black Lion' of Powys on their escutcheon and the crest A tower argent (symbolising Hendwr) which was confirmed in a grant of arms by Randle Holme, deputy herald for Chester and North Wales at the College of Arms. Their arms hang in the hall of Jesus College, Oxford where several members of the family were educated.

== See also ==
- Baron of Hendwr
- Owain Brogyntyn
- Nathanael Jones
- Giwn Lloyd
