= Baron of Hendwr =

Dormant title in the Peerage of England

Barony of Hendwr
- Creation date: 22 July 1284
- Created by: Edward I
- Peerage: Peerage of England
- First holder: Dafydd ap Gruffydd
- Status: Dormant

Baron of Hendwr, in the County of Merioneth, is a dormant title in the English Baronage which was created on 22 July 1284 for Dafydd ap Gruffydd ap Owain Brogyntyn (a cousin of Gruffydd ap Iorwerth, 1st Baron of Kymmer-yn-Edeirnion) by letters patent issued by Edward I at Caenarfon. Dafydd and his cousins were great grandchildren of Madog ap Maredudd, King of Powys, and had fought against Edward I during his Conquest of Wales. After coming into the King's Peace, they received a Royal pardon and were among the few members of the old Welsh royal dynasties to have their lands confirmed per Baroniam.

The name Hendwr or properly 'Yr Hendwr' is Welsh for 'the Old Tower' and refers to the old motte and bailey castle of the Kings of Powys which was inherited by the 1st Baron and became the caput of the barony of Hendwr.

The 2nd Baron was summoned to Quo Warranto proceedings on 7 December 1334 at Harlech to assess by what authority he claimed his title and he cited the charter granted to his father in 1284. The daughter of the 3rd Baron, Gwerful ferch Madog, was the wife of Goronwy ap Tudur, and therefore 3rd great-grandmother of King Henry VII. The 4th Baron, David de Hendwr married Sibella de Cornwall, daughter and heiress of John de Cornwall, great-grandson of Richard 1st Earl of Cornwall on 8 July 1343 at Westminster Abbey, by whom he inherited vast lands in Cornwall.

The brother of the 9th Baron, Dafydd ap Ieuan, was the constable of Harlech Castle during the War of the Roses and his brave defence is commemorated in the song Men of Harlech.

In 1652, the two halves of the barony of Hendwr were united when Nathanael Jones, who had inherited from the Jones of Hendwr the half of the barony centred on Ty Ucha, married the heiress of the principle half of the barony, centred on Hendwr house. For the later history of the barony and the 19th century court case see Giwn Lloyd.

== Barons of Hendwr (1284) ==
- Dafydd ap Gruffydd, 1st Baron of Hendwr (fl. 1277-1284)
- Gruffydd ap Dafydd, 2nd Baron of Hendwr (fl. 1292–1334), Squire of the Body to Edward I, High Sheriff of Merionethshire in 1300
- Madog de Hendwr, 3rd Baron of Hendwr (fl. 1313–1322), who supported Edward II in his Scottish Campaign
- David de Hendwr, 4th Baron of Hendwr (fl. 1343-1351)
- David de Hendwr, 5th Baron of Hendwr (d. 1390), who lived on the Cornish estates inherited by his mother
- Thomas de Hendwr, 6th Baron of Hendwr (1385–1433), ancestor of the Hender of Brannel, Devon family.
- Dafydd ap Giwn Lloyd ap David, 7th Baron of Hendwr (grandson of the 4th Baron)
- Angharad, 8th Baroness of Hendwr, who married Ieuan ab Einion ap Gruffydd (fl. 1427) of Cryniarth, scion of Osbwrn Wyddel.
- Gruffydd ap Ieuan, 9th Baron of Hendwr (fl. 1461)
- Ednyfed ap Gruffydd, 10th Baron of Hendwr (fl. 1521)
- Huw Wynn, 11th Baron of Hendwr
- Humphrey Wynn, 12th Baron of Hendwr (d. 1578)
- Huw Wynn, 13th Baron of Hendwr (fl. 1578)
- Humphrey Wynn, 14th Baron of Hendwr (b. 1617)
- Mary Wynn, 15th Baroness of Hendwr, who in 1652 married Nathanael Jones, a paternal descendant of the 4th Baron.
- Maurice Jones, 16th Baron of Hendwr (1654-1684) and High Sheriff of Merionethshire in 1684
- David Lloyd, 17th Baron of Hendwr (1668-1707), nephew of above and High Sheriff of Merionethshire in 1703, also a paternal descendant of the 4th Baron
- Giwn Lloyd, 18th Baron of Hendwr (1699-1774) and High Sheriff of Merionethshire in 1724

== See also ==
- Baron of Kymmer-yn-Edeirnion
- Nathanael Jones of Hendwr
- Giwn Lloyd of Hendwr
- Welsh peers and baronets
