= Penllyn (cantref) =

Welsh medieval cantref

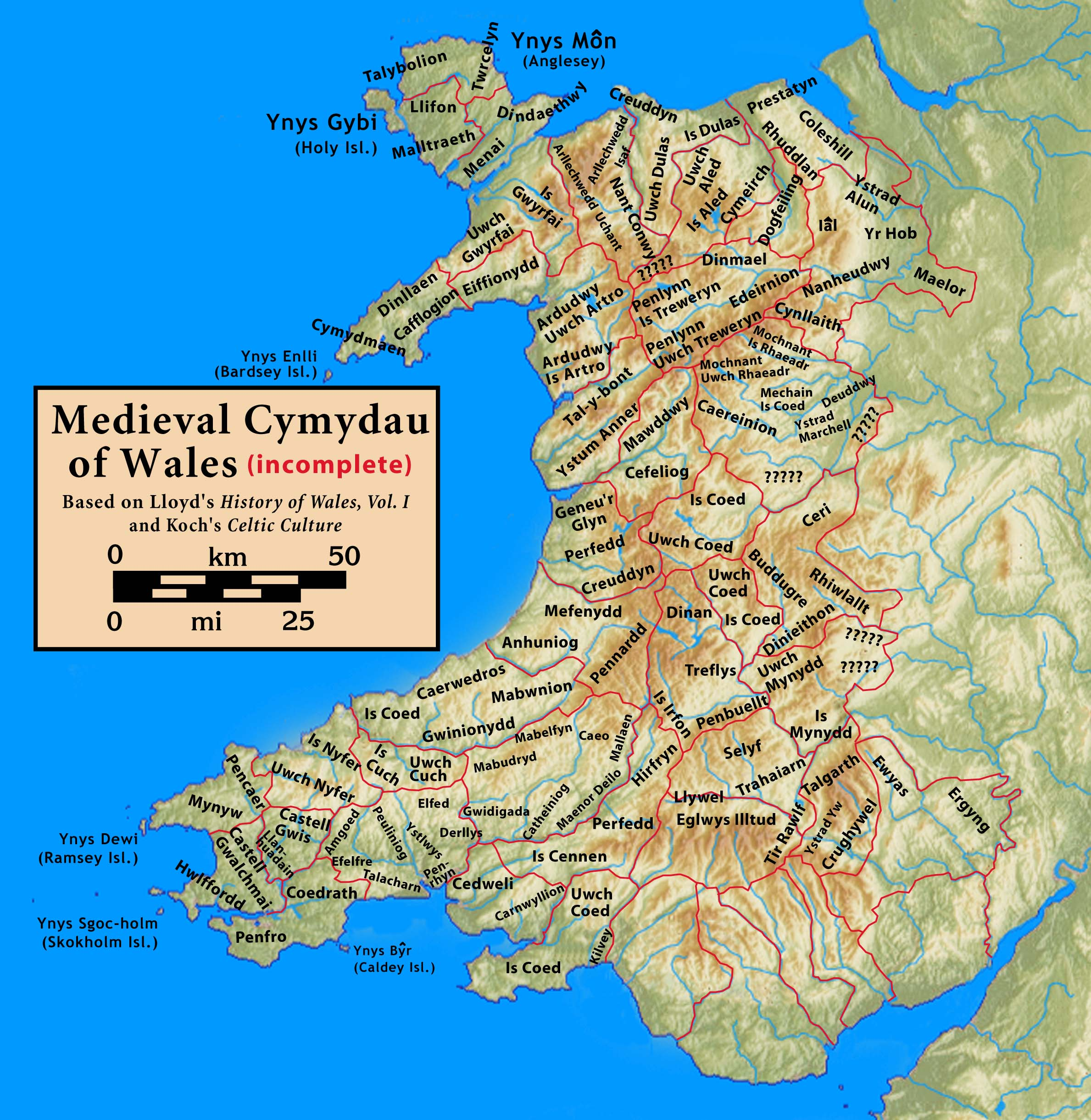
Medieval commotes of Wales

Penllyn (head of the lake i.e. Llyn Tegid or Bala Lake) was a medieval cantref originally in the Kingdom of Powys but annexed to the Kingdom of Gwynedd. It consisted of the commotes (cymydau) of Edeyrnion, Dinmael, Penllyn is Treweryn and Penllyn uwch Treweryn (is signifying 'below' and uwch 'above' the River Tryweryn).

On the north and west it bordered Gwynedd (the cantrefi of Tegeingl, Rhufoniog, Dunoding and Meirionnydd); it bordered the Powys cantrefi of Maelor, Mochnant and Cyfeiliog on the east and south.

After the death of Madog ap Maredudd, the last Prince of the whole of Powys, and his eldest son and heir in 1160, the kingdom was divided between his surviving sons Gruffudd Maelor, Owain Fychan and Owain Brogyntyn, his nephew Owain Cyfeiliog and his half-brother Iorwerth Goch. Penllyn was inherited by Owain Brogyntyn; Edeyrnion had been the home of his mother (who was not married to his father) and he may also have been raised there.

The military skill and strength of Madog had prevented Gwynedd from asserting hegemony over Powys, but following Madog's death, it was able to force Owain Brogyntyn to become a vassal. Penllyn was thus annexed to Gwynedd.

Following the eventual defeat of Gwynedd by English forces, and the consequent Statute of Rhuddlan, it became mostly part of Merionethshire.

== Princes of Penllyn ==
- Pebid 'Penllyn' (Father of Sulbych) (Note: 18 generations between Pebid and Meirion found in the Hanesyn Hen under Gwehelyth Penllyn)
- Sulbych ap Pebid 'Penllyn'
- Beblych ap Sulbych
- Gorflwng ap Beblych
- Cyndwlff ap Gorflwng
- Pandwlff ap Cyndwlff
- Ystader ap Pandwlff
- Puter ab Ystader
- Caper ap Puter
- Pybyr ap Caper
- Cadwr ap Pybyr
- Deiniog 'Lyth' ap Cadwr
- Dyfnwal ap Deiniog 'Lyth'
- Brochwel ap Dyfnwal
- Ednyfed ap Brochwel
- Tudwal ab Ednyfed
- Doned ap Tudwal
- Coed ap Doned
- Lleuddogw ap Coed
- Meirion ap Lleuddogw (Ruled before or during the composition of the Harleian genealogies in 988)
