= Hughes of Gwerclas =

Welsh royal dynasty

Arms of William Hughes (b. 1801)

Hughes of Gwerclas were a native Welsh royal family descended from prince Owain Brogyntyn the illegitimate but acknowledged son of prince Madog ap Maredudd (one of the last kings of Powys, of the House of Mathrafal) by a daughter of the "Maer du" or "black mayor" of Rûg in Edernion. His father granted to him and his successors the Cantref of Edeyrnion and the Lordship of Dinmael. These areas were both remote frontier lands situated between Powys and the neighbouring ascendant Kingdom of Gwynedd. From the earlier part of the 12th Century both lordships usually paid homage to Gwynedd.

Owain had three sons. It is from the youngest of these sons, Iorwerth ab Owain ap Madog ap Maredudd, that the barons of Cymmer yn Edeyrnion claim descent. Iorwerth's son, Gruffudd ab Iorwerth, was confirmed in his lands by Edward I in 1284. The first recorded use of the Kymmer yn Edernion baronial title is by Owain ap Dafydd (Owen ap David) (Owain's father was the 8th baron Edeyrnion) in 1334 who resided at Plas Uchaf in the parish of Llangar, Merionethshire. The family started using the surname "Hughes of Gwerclas" for Humphrey Hughes, the son of Hugh ap William after 1546. Over a century later it is Thomas Hughes, the "Esquire of Gwerclas and Hendreforfydd" who is recorded as having served as a captain under the Royalist standard for Charles I and died in 1670. His third and only surviving son John Hughes married a descendant of Ednyfed Fychan. John was succeeded first by his brother Hugh, and then his son Daniel the 15th Baron of Cymmer-yn-Edeirnion. Daniel married Catherine daughter of John Wynn "of Pen y Clawdd". He died in 1754 and from this time the Hughes of Gwerclas resided at Pen y Clawdd, thought to be in the vicinity of Chirk in Flintshire.

In 1851, the XVIIIth Baron of Kymmer yn Edeirnion was recorded as William Hughes Esq. (b. 1801 at Pen y Clawdd). He resided for a time at Gayton Mansion in Northamptonshire and, according to the 1851 National Census of England and Wales, was living at Twyford, Hampshire, with his wife, children, and domestic servants. Hughes was active in antiquarian debate and worked as a barrister at the Inner Temple. His only son, William O'Farrel Hughes, was still alive in 1911 as a 73-year-old retired clergyman, but left no children. A cousin, Lieutenant Talbot de Bashall Hughes (b. 1836), joined the Cape Mounted Riflemen in the 1850s, after which his fate is unrecorded. The Barony of Kymmer yn Edeirnion is regarded as dormant, as no living descendants of the Hughes of Gwerclas family have been identified.

"Few families can establish a loftier lineage, or deduce their descent through more numerous stocks of historic distinction, than the Hughes of Gwerclas, Barons of Kymmer yn Edeirnion, within the ancient Principality of Powys and Kingdom of Wales. Derived, by uninterrupted lineal male succession, from Owain Brogyntyn, Lord of Edeirnion, Dinmael and Abertanat in Powys, son of Madoc, last Sovereign Prince of Powys, the existing heir of the Hughes's deduces, through the Baronial Lords of Kymmer, and the Royal Line of Powys, a genealogy of twenty eight descents, extending over ten centuries, transmitted in common with the lineage of the monarchs of North Wales and South Wales, from Rhodri Mawr, renowned in the annals of the Cymri as the Egbert of his race, who, uniting the several states of North Wales, South Wales and Powys, became King of all Wales, AD 843."
—Burkes Landed Gentry, 1850, p.603
