= Nathanael Jones =

Welsh poet

Nathanael Jones (c. 1624 – 1683), Esq., of Hendwr, Merionethshire, was a Welsh gentleman-poet.

Nathanael Jones was born in the parish of Llandrillo-yn-Edeirnion, the second son of Maurice Jones, Esq. of Faerdref Uchaf, and later moved to Hendwr, Merionethshire, an Elizabethan mansion of great antiquity, within the same parish. He was descended from the Barons of Kymmer-yn-Edeirnion, and as such bore the 'Black Lion of Powys' on his arms and 'Kymmer-yn-Edeirnion' as his motto, in memory of the paternal barony.

== Military career ==
During the English Civil War, Jones joined the Royalist army as a Lieutenant, along with his elder brother, and subsequently fought at the Battle of Marston Moor and was later captured at the Battle of Ormskirk, during the Royalist retreat through Lancashire. In 1652, he married Mary Wynn, the daughter and heiress of Humphrey ap Hugh Wynn, by whom he inherited the Hendwr estate.

From the 1650s, Jones began writing poetry and was a minor poet in the circle of Matthew Owen, 'the Bard of Llangar'. Though as a Justice of the Peace, Nathanael was expected to speak in English in public, his poetry is entirely in Welsh. Due to the war, he had been unable to complete his education by going up to Oxford as had been family tradition, yet despite this he was still very well-educated for the time. His son Maurice however matriculated at Jesus College on 20 March 1673/4, aged 19. He later served as High Sheriff of Merionethshire in 1673 and was the coroner for that county. He was also a translator of English textbooks into Welsh so that they could be more widely-read, surviving manuscripts include Taylor's 'Daily Rule' and 'The Act of Contentment'. He died in 1683, aged 59, whereupon he was succeeded by his son, Maurice Jones.
