= Rhug =

Township in Denbighshire, Wales

Coordinates: 52°58′50″N 3°23′39″W

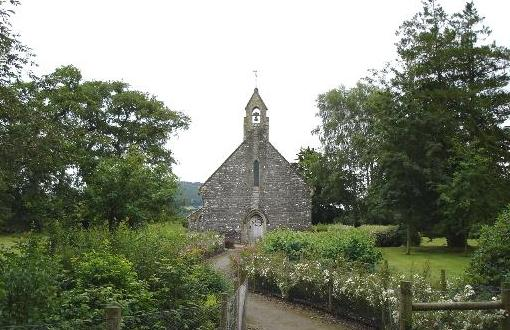
Rhug Chapel, Denbighshire

Rhug (normally Y Rug in Welsh; sometimes given the antiquarian spelling Rûg) is a township in the parish of Corwen, Denbighshire, Wales, formerly in the old cantref of Edeirnion and later a part of Merionethshire, two miles from Corwen and ten miles north east of Bala. It includes the hamlet of Bonwen. It is situated near the River Dee, under Berwyn range. About 1150, it was ruled by the Maer Du or "Black Mayor of Rhug" and later became part of the lands of the barons of Edeirnion (see Hughes of Gwerclas) who ruled from Gwerclas Castle.

== History ==
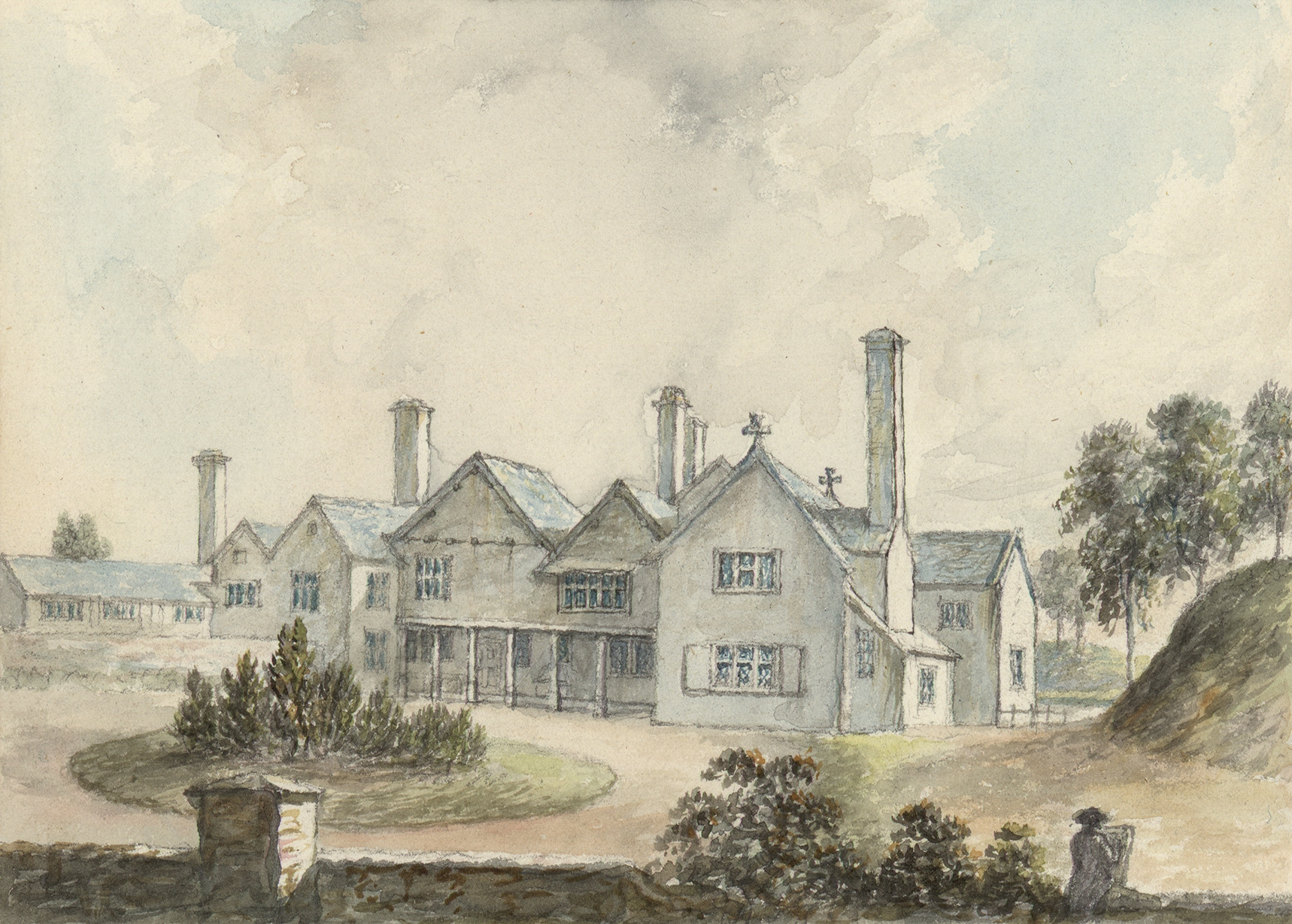
Rhug manor house, c.1778

The Lordship of Rhug contained the townships of Aber Alwen in the ecclesiastical parish of Corwen, which is where the manor house of Rhug was situated. It was apparently at Rhug that King Gruffudd ap Cynan was staying when he was betrayed by Meirion Goch of Llŷn, in 1080. Hugh Lupus, Earl of Chester and Hugh, Earl of Salop, hearing that the prince was at Rhug came with a group of soldiers under the pretence of visiting him. Meirion Goch persuaded Gruffudd to go with a small guard to meet them, not knowing of the kidnapping plot by the earls, and was seized and carried off to Chester Castle. He was kept there for twelve years in chain and irons. The guards that accompanied Gruffudd were likewise taken prisoners, and after having been barbarously treated, and their right-hand thumbs cut off, were then allowed to go free. It was said that Owain Brogyntyn resided at Rhug after he became Lord of Dinmael and Edeirnion, and the lordship of Rhug devolved to the descendants of Bleddyn, Lord of Dinmael, the second son of Owain Brogyntyn. Margaret Wen, lady of Rhug, the sole daughter and heiress of Ieuan ap Howel ap Rhys, Lord of Rhug, married Piers Salusbury of Bachymbyd.

== Rhug Chapel ==
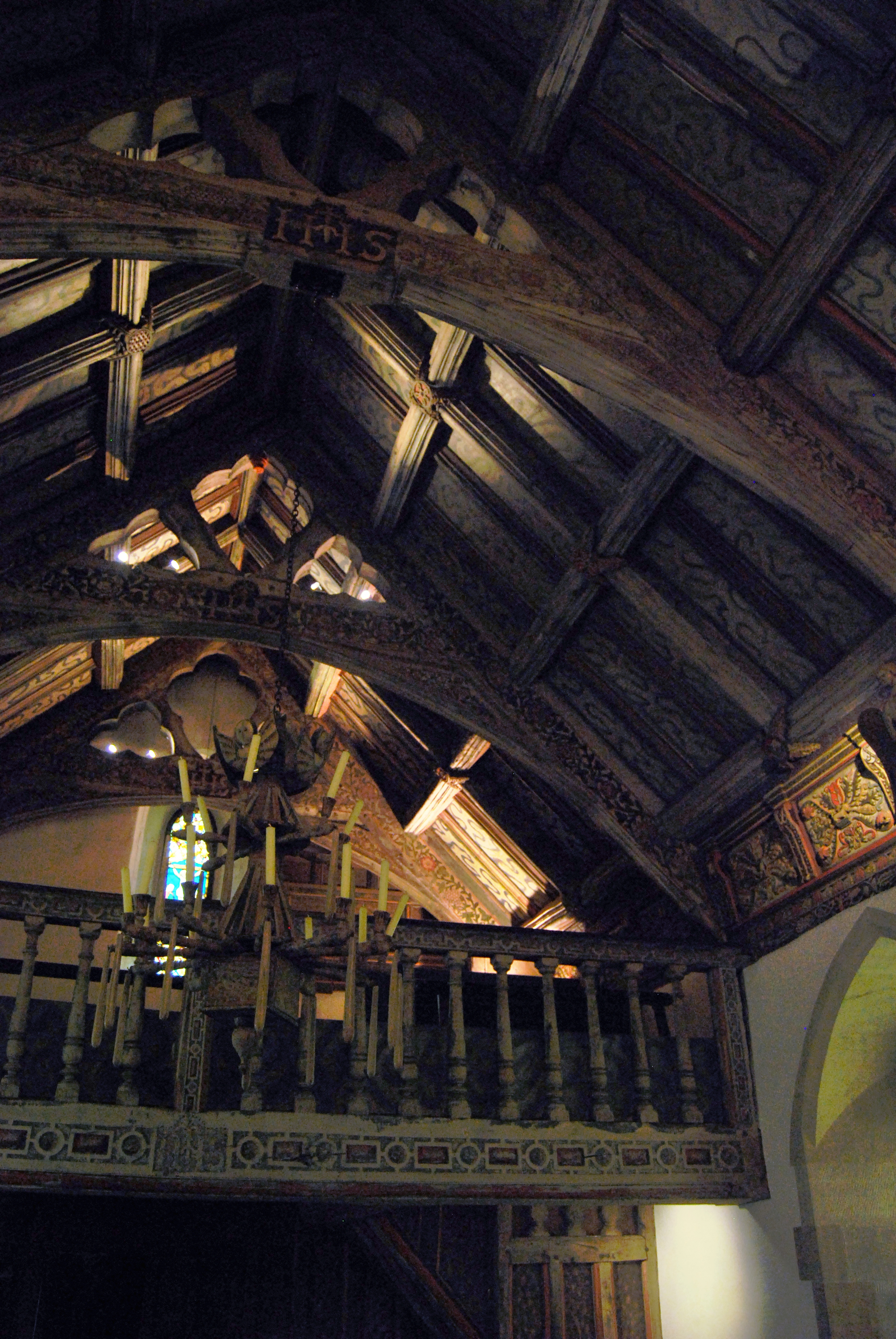
Rhug Chapel. part of remarkable interior

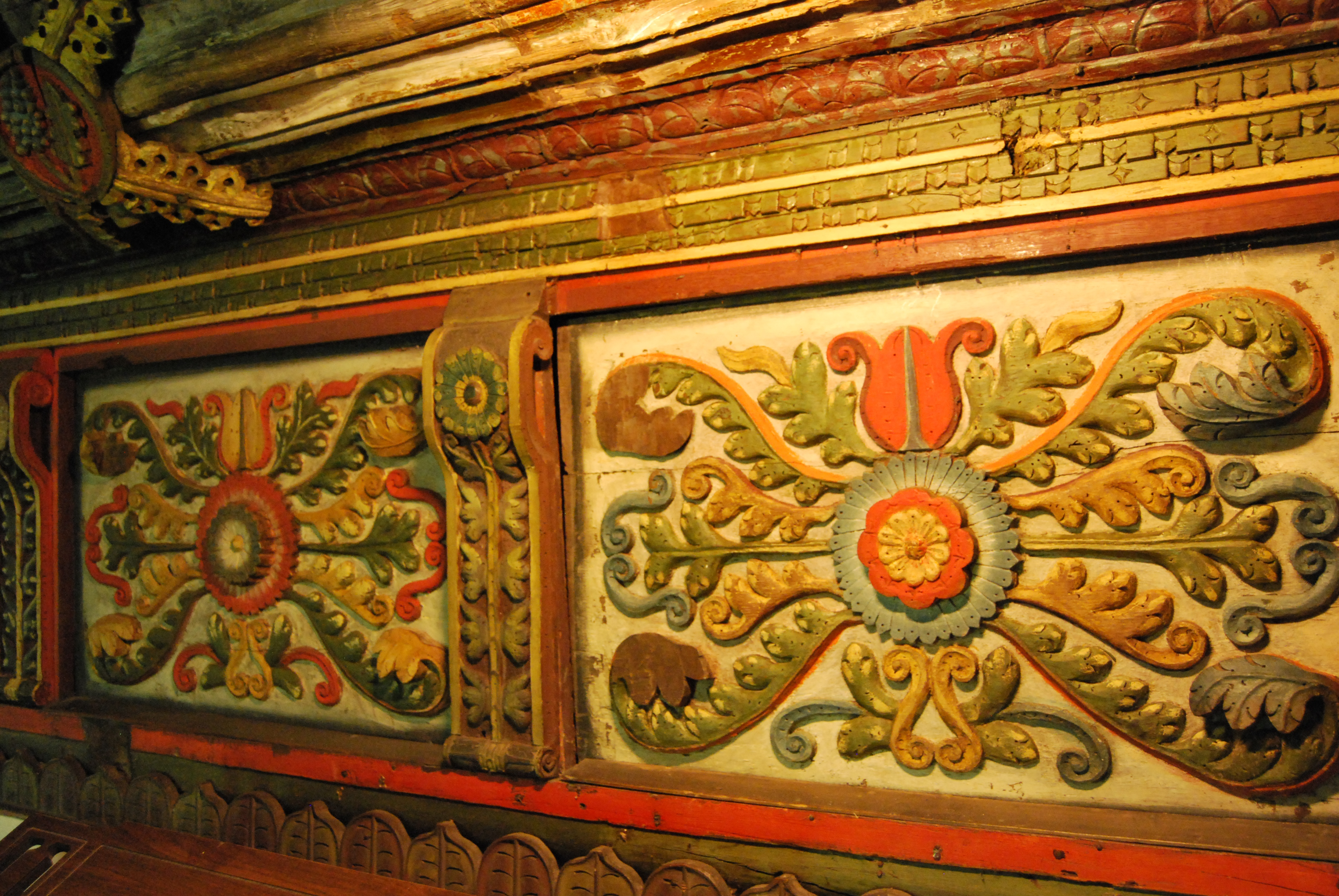
Rhug wall panels

Colonel William Salusbury (1580–1660), affectionately known as Hen Hosanau Gleision "Old Blue Stockings", was a colourful character famed for his part as a Royalist in the defence of Denbigh Castle in the English Civil War. Although a warrior in early years, he later became a successful writer of Welsh verse and was noted for his “high church” views. In 1637 he had a private chapel built in collaboration with Bishop William Morgan, who was sympathetic to Salisbury's views and the first translator of the Bible into Welsh. The resulting chapel, dedicated to The Holy Trinity, is quite plain and unremarkable to external view. A small construction in stone, it consists of a simple nave/chancel with access through a timber arched door at the west end of the church into an extremely small porch and a door and porch at the north chancel wall for the use of the minister. Above the west door is a single external bell.

The chapel is set in a woodland approximately a quarter mile from the A5 junction at Ty'n-y-cefn and maintained since 1990 by Cadw (the historic environment service of the Welsh Government). Since 2024, Cadw are to refer to it under the Welsh name Capel y Rug only, but have not yet done so as of 2026. Admittance can be gained through the purchase of a joint ticket to see this chapel with the ancient church at Llangar, about three miles away. On passage through the heavy oak west door, the visitor enters a small porch, before meeting a second timber door. On the right a wall holds a bell rope and to the left is a timber staircase leading through a quarter landing to the right and to the gallery. Taking the stairs will afford a view of the church interior. Immediately and closely visible is the rood roof, decorated throughout with intertwining rose motifs. Wall panels are carved and painted, and carved and painted angels adorn the walls. (See Gallery).

The nave is separated from the chancel with a low rood screen of sturdy and ornately carved construction. Each window is finished with bright stained glass, of different ages, and with different depictions. The pews are built of oak and the aisle ends of the pews are, unusually, finished with huge oak timber scalloped plinth which are richly carved with beasts and birds. Large chandeliers provided the lighting and are supported on long iron rods from the roof. The nave is simple in contrast. The north wall bears a large painting of a memento mori, a recumbent skeleton designed to remind the congregation of their own mortality. Apart from the altar itself and tiled sanctuary, installed in the late nineteenth or early twentieth centuries, all here is original despite the Protestant Reformation.

Outside the chapel, some 30 yards west of the West Door, is a pillar on a double stone base that appears to be a town or market cross though there is no obvious evidence of a settlement in this area and the chapel was built many centuries after such crosses were normally erected.

To the north of the West Door is a circular iron railing protecting memorial stones to the Wynn family. Inside the church is a memorial to Robert Vaughan of the estate of Nannau near Llanfachreth in Wales. He had interests in Rhug and oversaw restoration of the chapel with great sympathy to the original intent. Vaughan, in 1854, remodelled the exterior bell tower and windows yet left the interior virtually untouched despite the requirements of the recent restoration. The pews, however, were widened and provided with backs though finished in a colour and style similar to that of the original Neo-Jacobean.

== Gallery ==
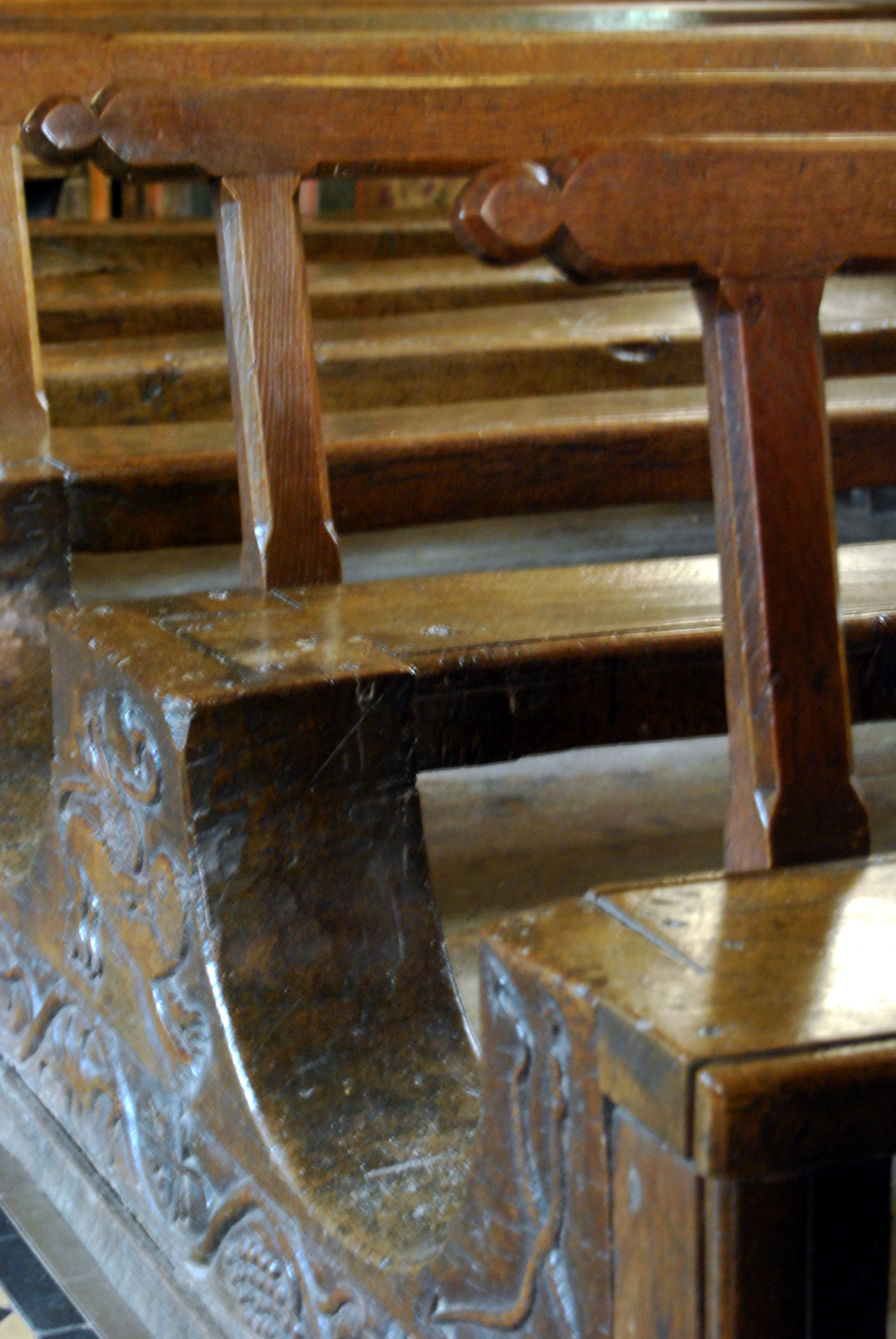
Rhug solid timber pew ends

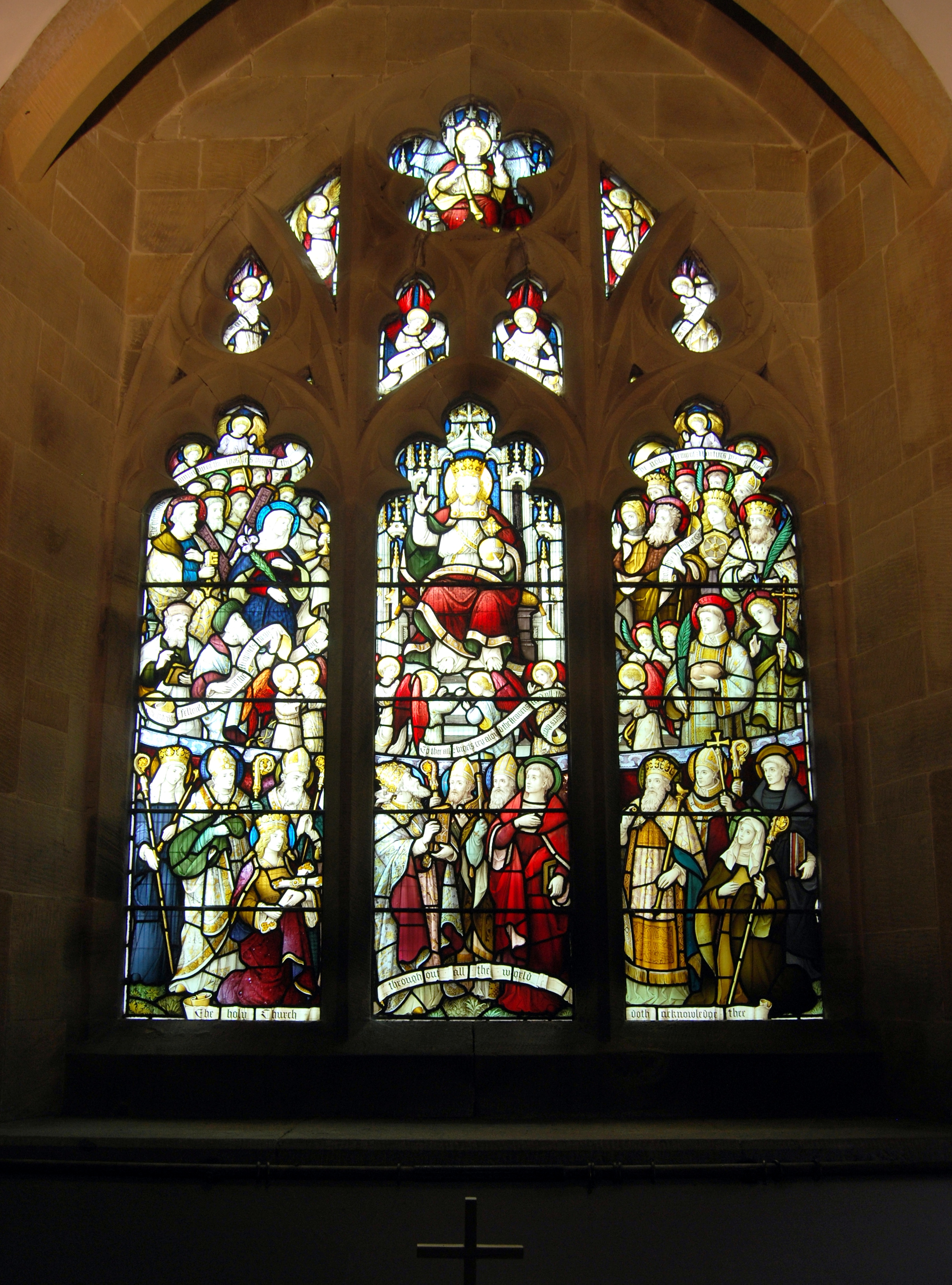
Rhug East Window

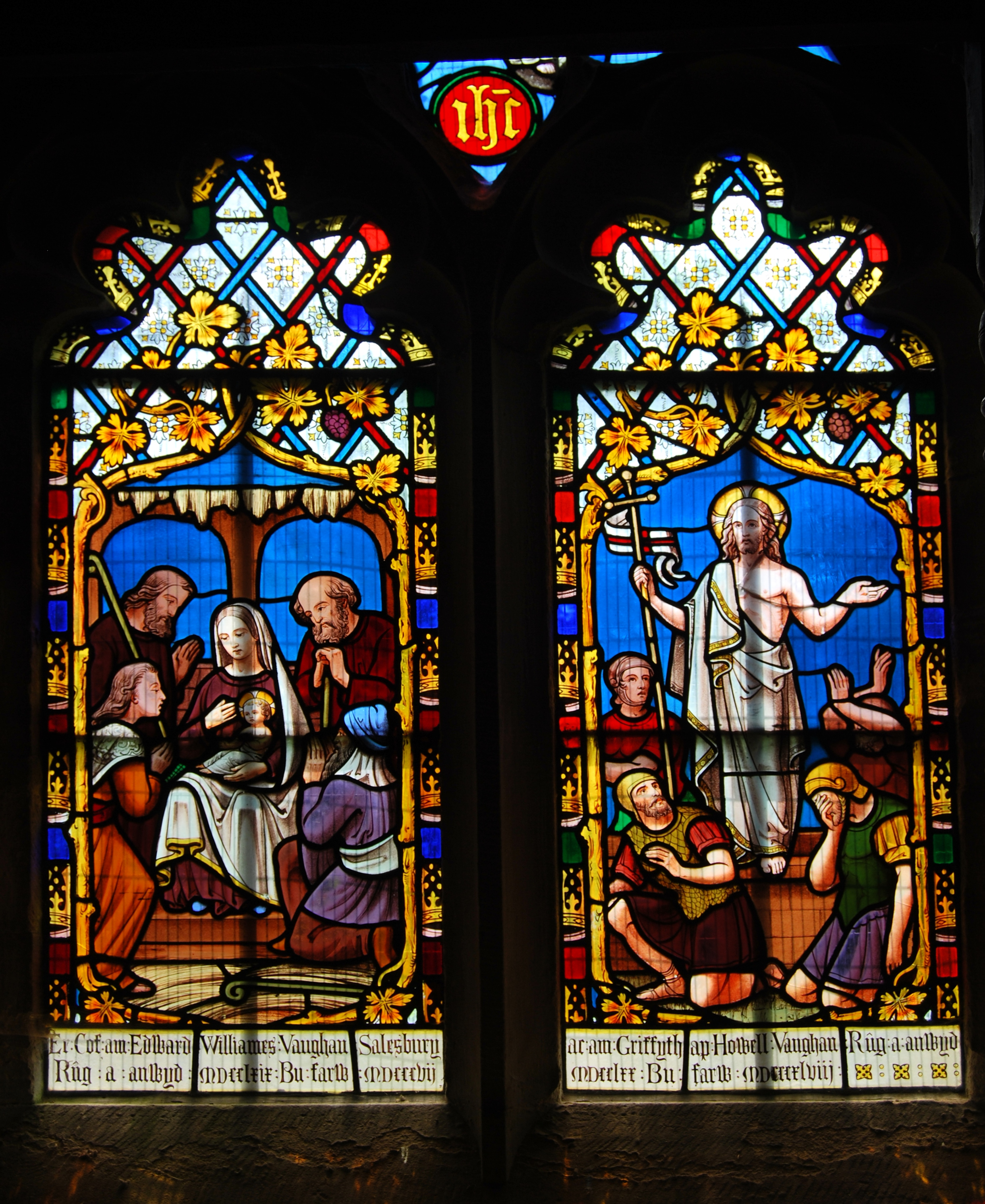
Rhug window

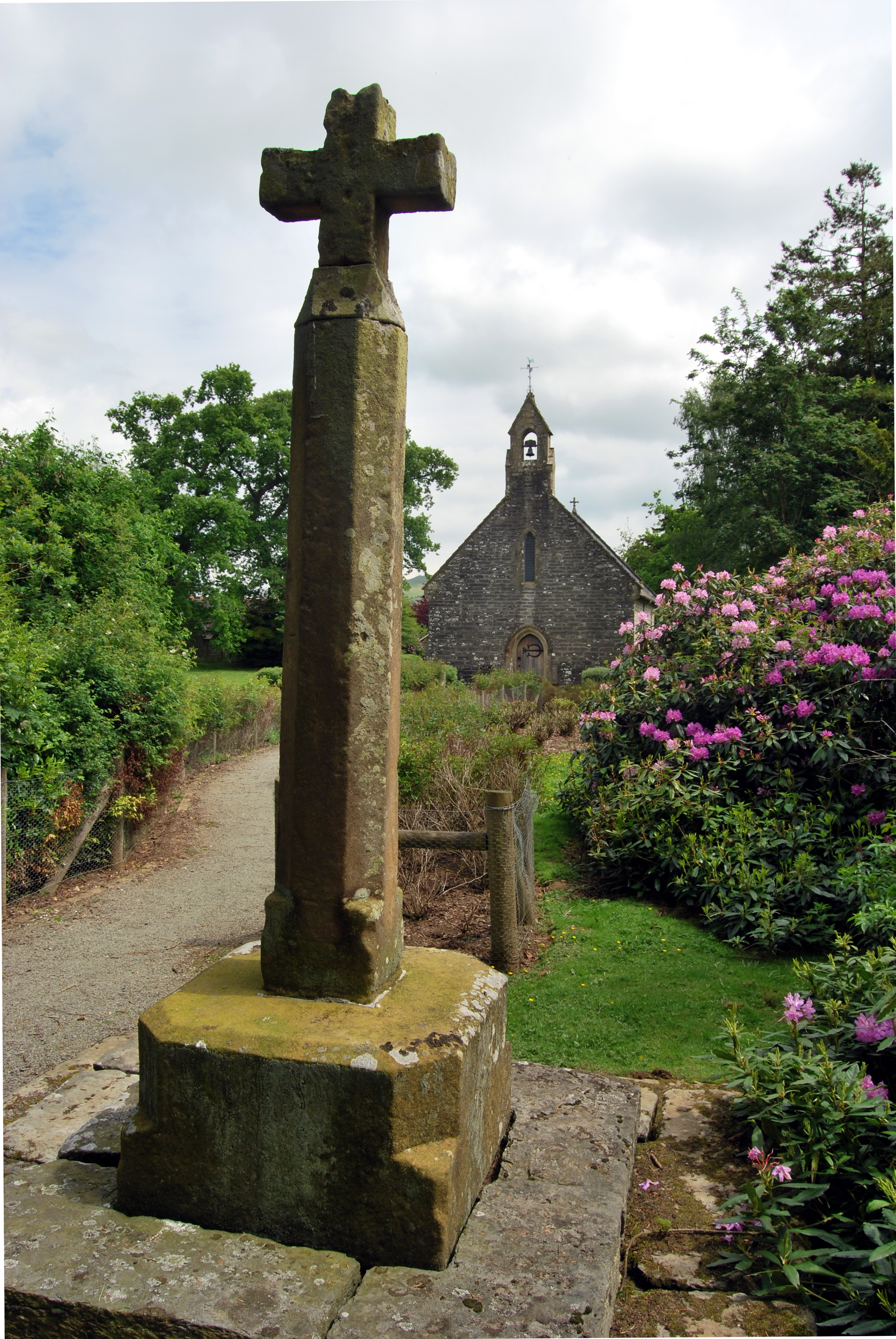
Rhug Ancient Cross

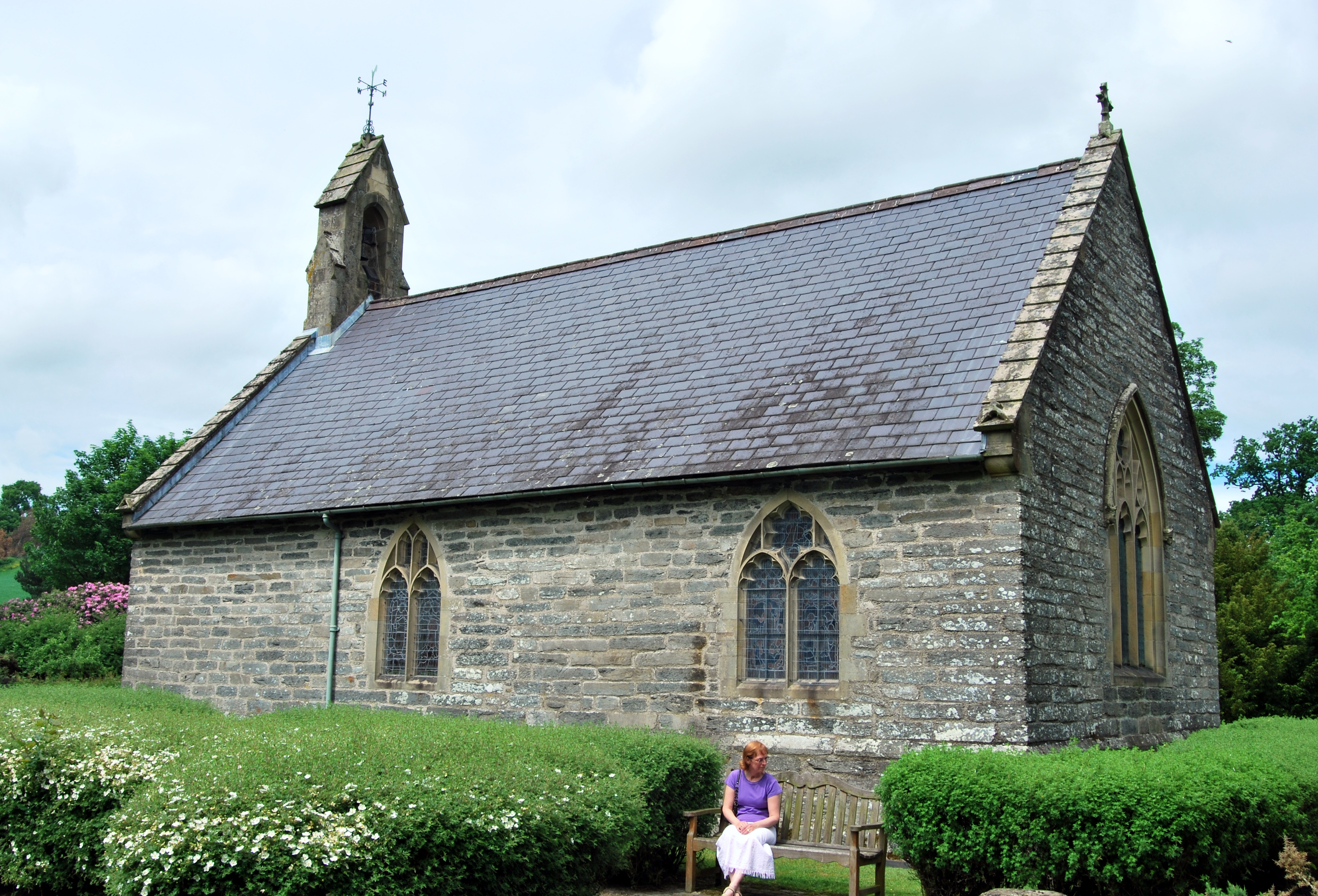
Rhug Chapel

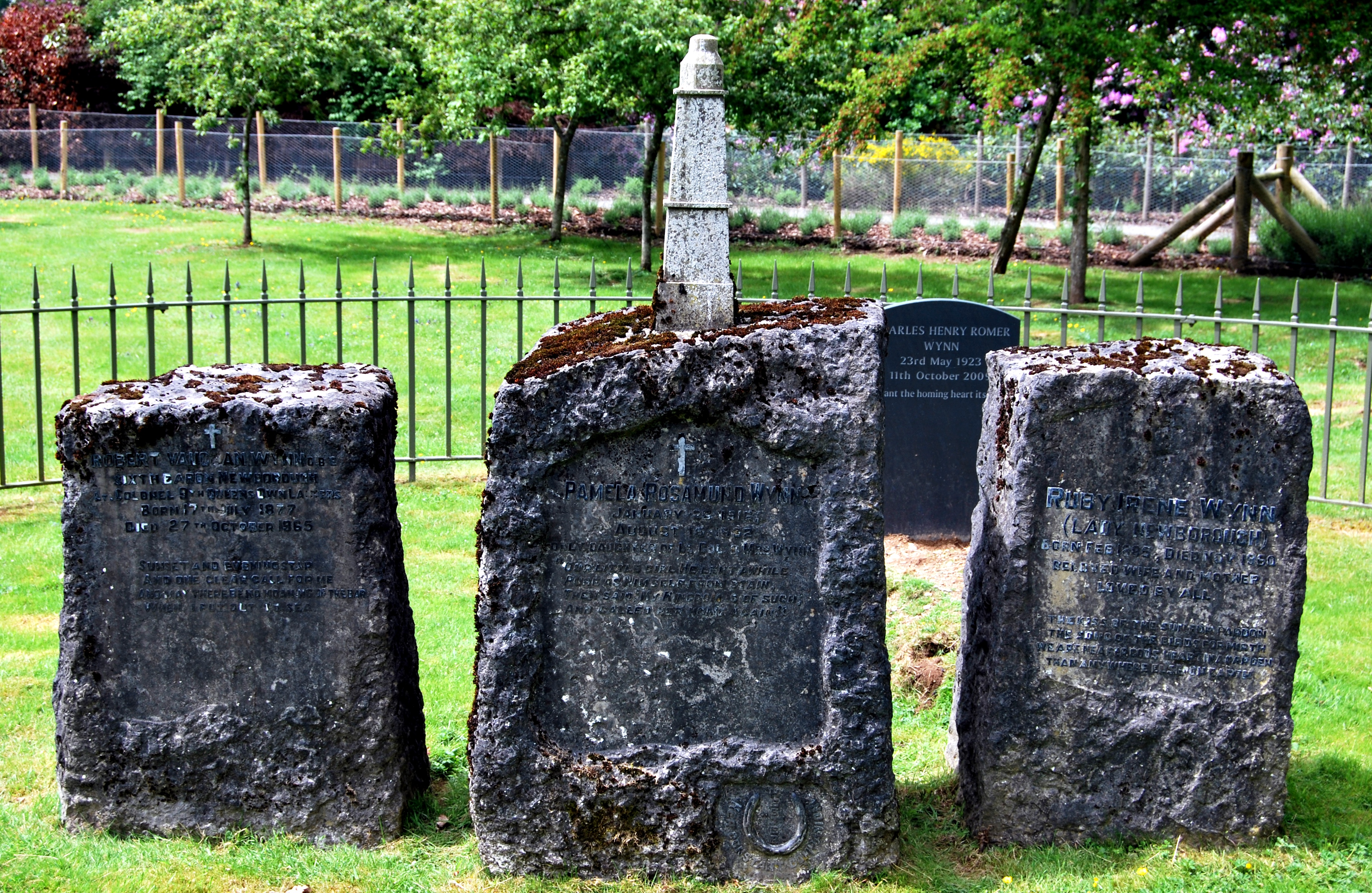
Rhug Wynn family memorials
