= Dafydd ap Harri Wyn =

16th-century Welsh poet

Dafydd ap Harri Wyn (fl. 1568) was a Welsh poet, from the Edeirnion area.

His work was said to be superior to that of any other poet who graduated at the Eisteddfod at Caerwys, but he refused to graduate and followed this up by destroying what he had written, which he described as 'vanity'.
