= Northern Powys =

Northern Powys or North Powys may refer to:

- Northern parts of the modern county of Powys
- Montgomeryshire, former county, and later an area of the modern county of Powys, roughly equivalent its northern parts.
- Northern Powys (medieval), or Powys Fadog, northern lordship created after the disintegration of the Kingdom of Powys.
