= Meirionnydd =

Region of Wales

Coordinates: 52.758°N 3.835°W

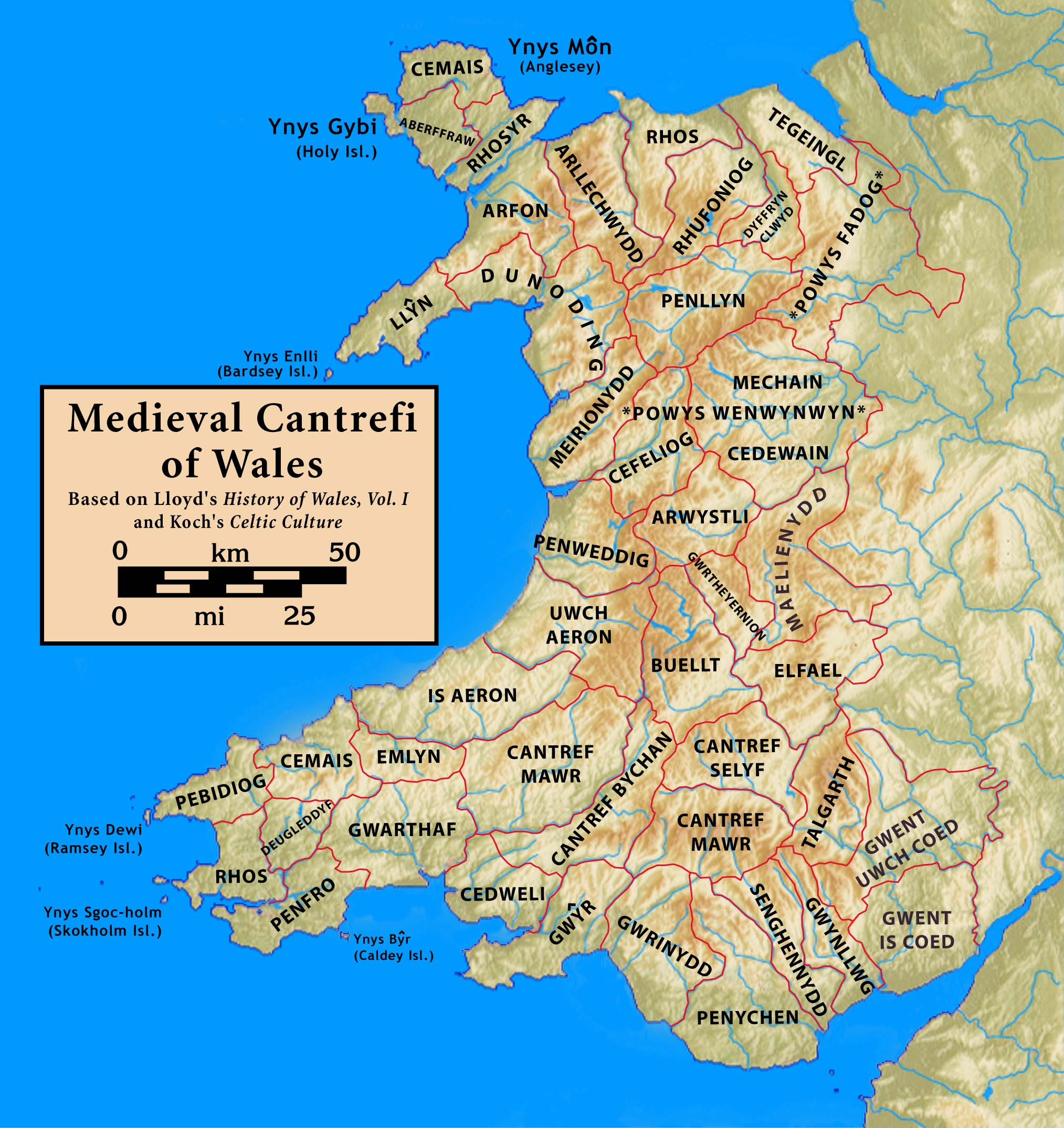
Map of Welsh cantrefi

Meirionnydd is a coastal and mountainous region of Wales. It has been a kingdom, a cantref, a district and, as Merionethshire, a county. It is currently a committee area within the county Gwynedd.

== Kingdom ==
Meirionnydd (Meirion, with -ydd as a Welsh suffix of land, literally 'Land adjoined to Meirion') was a sub-kingdom of Gwynedd, founded according to legend by Meirion (derived from the Latin name Marianus), a grandson of Cunedda, a warrior-prince who brought his family to Wales from the Hen Ogledd (the 'Old North', northern England and southern Scotland today), probably in the early 5th century. His dynasty seems to have ruled there for the next four hundred years. The kingdom lay between the River Mawddach and the River Dyfi, spreading in a north-easterly direction.

== Cantref ==
The ancient name of the cantref was Cantref Orddwy (or 'the cantref of the Ordovices'). The familiar name coming from Meirion's kingdom.

The cantref of Meirionnydd held the presumed boundaries of the previous kingdom but now as a fief of the Kingdom of Gwynedd where it continued to enjoy long spells of relative independence. It was divided into the commotes of Ystumanner (administered from Castell y Bere at Llanfihangel-y-Pennant) and Talybont (possibly centred on Llanegryn where there is a mound). The cantref was effectively abolished in 1284 following the Statute of Rhuddlan with the area being reorganised with the addition of some neighbouring cantrefi to form the county of Merionethshire.

== County ==
Historic county of Merioneth

The area of Meirionnydd was enlarged under the Statute of Rhuddlan to become a county, gaining the old cantrefi of Penllyn and Ardudwy (shown as Dunoding in the map of medieval cantrefi). The name for the county was anglicised to the English phonetic equivalent of Merioneth, sometimes appearing with the suffix -shire as Merionethshire.

Merioneth became an administrative county with an elected county council in 1889 under the Local Government Act 1888. In 1974 the administrative county was abolished with most of the area merging with Caernarfonshire and Anglesey to create a new county of Gwynedd.

== District ==
Meirionnydd
- District
- Meirionnydd shown within Wales
- Population
  - 1971: 29,531
  - 1992 (estimate): 32,900
- History
  - Created: 1 April 1974
  - Abolished: 31 March 1996
  - Succeeded by: Gwynedd
  - HQ: Dolgellau

The 1974 reforms established a two-tier system, with upper-tier county councils and lower-tier district councils. The county of Gwynedd was divided into five districts, one of which was called Meirionnydd, reverting to the Welsh spelling of the name Merioneth. The district of Meirionnydd covered almost the same area as the pre-1974 county of Merioneth, excluding only the Edeirnion Rural District, which went to the Glyndŵr district of Clwyd. The Meirionnydd district replaced eight former districts:

- Bala Urban District
- Barmouth Urban District
- Deudraeth Rural District
- Dolgellau Rural District
- Dolgellau Urban District
- Ffestiniog Urban District
- Penllyn Rural District
- Tywyn Urban District

Under the Local Government (Wales) Act 1994, the previous two-tier system of counties and districts was replaced with new principal areas (each designated either a "county" or a "county borough"), whose councils perform the functions previously divided between the county and district councils. The Meirionnydd area merged with the neighbouring Arfon and Dwyfor districts to become a county, which the government originally named Caernarfonshire and Merionethshire. During the transition to the new system, the shadow authority requested a change of name from Caernarfonshire and Merionethshire to Gwynedd. The government confirmed the change with effect from 2 April 1996, one day after the new council came into being.

Since 1996, Gwynedd Council has used the former Meirionnydd district as a committee area for discussing local matters.

=== Political control ===
The first election to Meirionnydd District Council was held in 1973, initially operating as a shadow authority alongside the outgoing authorities until it came into its powers on 1 April 1974. Throughout the council's existence a majority of the seats on the council were held by independents:as follows:

Party in control	Years
Independent	1974–1996

=== Premises ===
The district council was based at Cae Penarlâg in Dolgellau, which had been built in 1953 as the headquarters of the old Merioneth County Council. Since 1996 the building has served as an area office of Gwynedd Council.
