= Baron of Cymmer-yn-Edeirnion =

Titular Welsh noble family

Arms of the Barons of Kymmer-yn-Edeirnion

Baron of Cymmer-yn-Edeirnion (or Kymmer-yn-Edeirnion), in the county of Merioneth, is a dormant title used by the Hughes of Gwerclas, the senior male-line descendants of Prince Owain Brogyntyn, youngest son of Madog ap Maredudd, King of Powys. Owain Brogyntyn divided his lands equally between his three sons on his death, and his eldest son, Iorwerth, inherited lands centred on Cymmer (or Kymmer), in the parish of Llangar and commote of Edeirnion (part of Merionethshire). His son, Gruffydd ab Iorwerth, fought against Edward I during his invasion of Wales. After the Conquest of Wales, Gruffydd came "into the King's peace", and on 22 July 1284, had his lands confirmed by Edward I per baroniam, 'just as his ancestors had held them', thereby creating him a baron in the English feudal baronage. The first surviving use of the title was by Gruffydd's grandson, Owain, who in 1334 was summoned to the sessions at Harlech as Owenus ap Davidus, Dominus de Kimmer. Some authorities, therefore, date the barons from Owain, whereas others begin with Gruffydd. In the fifteenth century their principal residence was known as Plas o Cymmer, and was later renamed Plas Uchaf. Later the 10th Baron moved to the nearby mansion of Gwerclas.

== Barons of Kymmer-yn-Edeirnion (1284) ==
- Gruffydd ab Iorwerth ab Owain Brogyntyn (fl. 1284–92), 1st Baron of Kymmer-yn-Edeirnion
- Dafydd ap Gruffydd, his son, (fl. 1301), 2nd Baron of Kymmer-yn-Edeirnion
- Owain ap Dafydd, his son, (fl. 1334), 3rd Baron of Kymmer-yn-Edeirnion
- Llywelyn Ddu ap Dafydd, his brother (fl. 1370), 4th Baron of Kymmer-yn-Edeirnion
- Ieuan ap Llywelyn Ddu, his son, (d. 1392), 5th Baron of Kymmer-yn-Edeirnion
- Rhys ab Ieuan, his son, (fl. 1392–1415), 6th Baron of Kymmer-yn-Edeirnion
- Dafydd ap Rhys, his son, (d. 1444), 7th Baron of Kymmer-yn-Edeirnion
- Gruffydd Fychan ap Dafydd, his son, 8th Baron of Kymmer-yn-Edeirnion
- William ap Gruffydd Fychan, his son, 9th Baron of Kymmer-yn-Edeirnion, his daughter married Roger Lloyd Yale, brother of Chancellor Thomas Yale
- Huw ap William, his son, (fl. 1546–1602), 10th Baron of Kymmer-yn-Edeirnion, who moved his residence from Plas Uchaf to Gwerclas. His pedigree and arms were confirmed at the visitations of Wales on 7 October 1594.
- Humphrey Hughes, his son, (d. 1620), 11th Baron of Kymmer-yn-Edeirnion, who assumed, with his brother, the surname 'Hughes' and was High Sheriff of Merionethshire in 1618.
- Richard Hughes, his brother (1561-1641), 12th Baron of Kymmer-yn-Edeirnion, who was High Sheriff of Merionethshire in 1619.
- Humphrey Hughes, his son (1605-1682), 13th Baron of Kymmer-yn-Edeirnion, who was a Commissioner of Array during the English Civil War and fought at the Battle of Rowton Moor. He was High Sheriff of Merionethshire in 1661. His daughter married Thomas Yale, grandnephew of Chancellor Thomas Yale
- Hugh Hughes, his grandson (1659-1725), 14th Baron of Kymmer-yn-Edeirnion, High Sheriff of Merionethshire in 1720, husband of Dorothy Yale, daughter of the previous Thomas Yale
- Daniel Hughes, his nephew (1694-1754), 15th Baron of Kymmer-yn-Edeirnion
- John Hughes, his son (1742-1784), 16th Baron of Kymmer-yn-Edeirnion
- William Hughes, his son (1779-1836), 17th Baron of Kymmer-yn-Edeirnion
- William Hughes, his son (1801-), 18th Baron of Kymmer-yn-Edeirnion, a captain in the Royal Horse Guards (the Blues).
- The Rev'd. William O'Farrell Hughes, his son (1838-), 19th Baron of Kymmer-yn-Edeirnion

== Titular Barons ==
- Isaac Bateman Hughes, titular 20th Baron of Kymmer-yn-Edeirnion, born 1828, 1st cousin of the 19th Baron and of Lt. Talbot de Bashall Hughes.
- William Hughes, titular 21st Baron of Kymmer-yn-Edeirnion, born circa 1858 in Hope, Flintshire, Wales, son of Isaac.
- Owen William Hughes, titular 22nd Baron of Kymmer-yn-Edeirnion, born circa 1881 in Holyhead, Anglesey, Wales, son of William.
- William Isaac Hughes, titular 23rd Baron of Kymmer-yn-Edeirnion, born January, 1909, in Holyhead, Anglesey, Wales, son of Owen.
- Merfyn Hughes, titular 24th Baron of Kymmer-yn-Edeirnion, (born 11 August 1940 in Holyhead, Anglesey, Wales; died July, 1980 at Ynys Mon), son of Harry Hughes (1914-1942) who was the 1st cousin of the titular 23rd Baron.
- Martin Hughes, titular 25th Baron of Kymmer-yn-Edeirnion (born October, 1978 in Caernarvon), son of Merfyn.

None of these titular barons have claimed the title Baron of Kymmer-yn-Edeirnion, they are simply the heirs to that title on the basis of primogeniture.

== See also ==
- Baron of Hendwr
- Hughes of Gwerclas
- Owain Brogyntyn
- Jones of Faerdref Uchaf
