= Henders =

Henders is a surname. Notable people with the surname include:

- Richard Coe Henders (1853–1932), Canadian farmer, Methodist minister, and politician
- Richard Henders, British actor

== See also ==
- Hender
