= Madog ap Gruffudd Maelor =

Welsh Prince of Powys Fadog

Tradiotional arms of Madog ap Gruffydd Maelor, later the Banner of the princely realm of Powys Fadog

Madog ap Gruffudd, or Madog ap Gruffudd Maelor, was a Prince of Powys Fadog from 1191 to 1236 in north-east Wales, and Lord of Powys. He was the founder of Valle Crucis Abbey in the Lordship of Yale.

== Early life ==
He was elder son of Prince Gruffydd Maelor and his wife, Angharad, a daughter of King Owain Gwynedd. He succeeded his father jointly with his brother, Owen, in 1191 and on Owen's death in 1197 became the sole ruler of Powys north of the River Rhaeadr and the Afon Tanat.

Madog consolidated the possessions of his father, Prince Gruffudd Maelor, and the territory he ruled became known as Powys Fadog (Fadog in Welsh is a lenited form of his name, Madog) in his honour, the remainder of the old kingdom formed Powys Wenwynwyn. After his death in 1236, this area—comprising Welsh and English Maelor, Ial (Yale), Cynllaith, Nanheudwy and Mochnant Is Rhaeadr—was still referred to as Powys Fadog although it was divided up between his five sons.

Madog was close to his cousin, prince Llywelyn ap Iorwerth, initially, but gradually distanced himself and also kept aloof from 1212 when his cousin had managed to reform the Welsh Confederacy and looked instead to King John of England, in whose pay he was, as an official ally of the English king. By 1215 he decided to ally with his cousin and remained so.

== Establishment of and burial at Valle Crucis Abbey ==
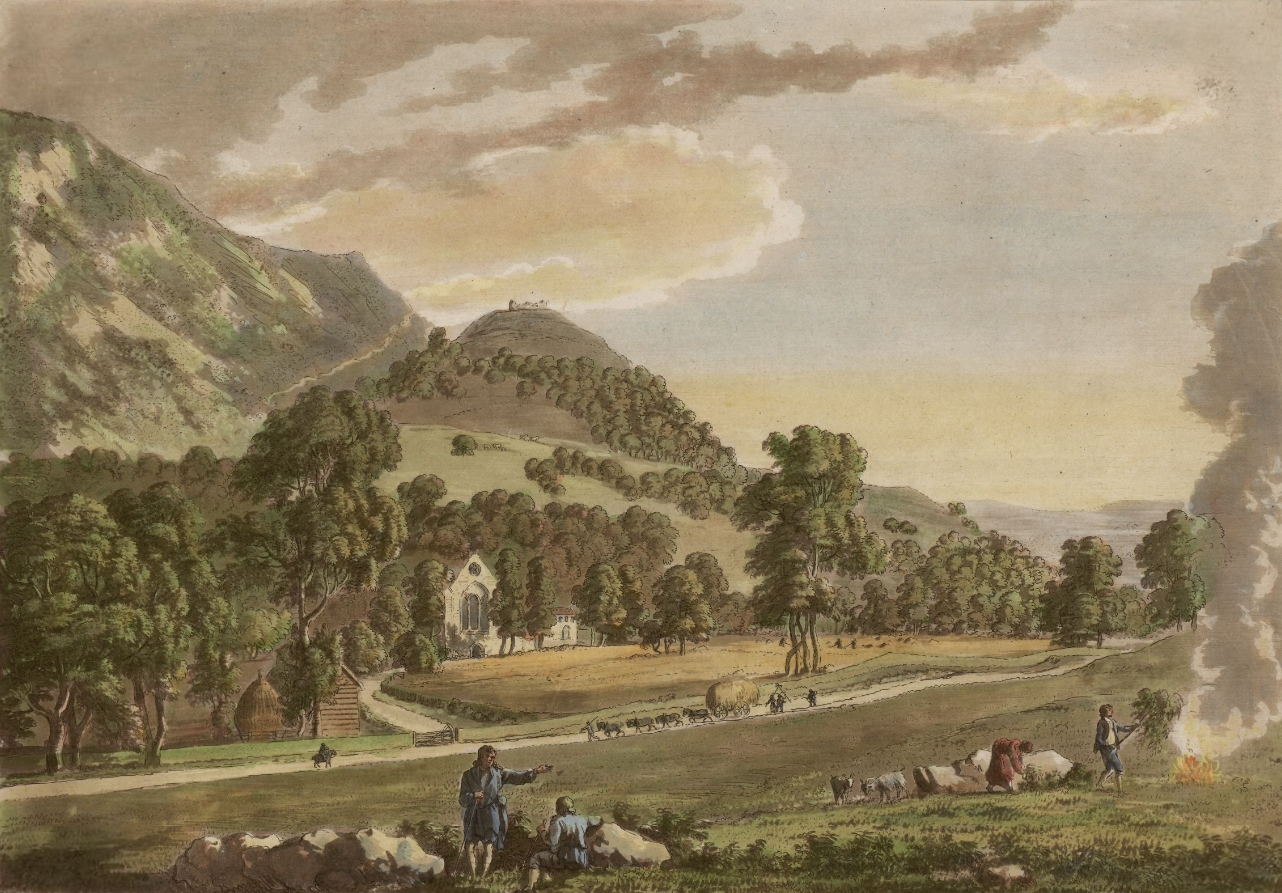
View of Valle Crucis Abbey and the Castle of Dinas Bran, of the princes of Powys Fadog

On 28 January 1201, Madog founded the Cistercian abbey of Valle Crucis Abbey, Llangollen, Wales. The abbey was founded with monks from nearby Strata Marcella abbey.

He is buried at Valle Crucis Abbey in the abbey church, as are several of Madog's descendants. The exact site of his burial is unknown.

He is an ancestor of Owain Glyndŵr, Prince of Wales.

== Marriage and children ==
He had married Esyllt (Isolda). He had issue:

- Gruffudd Maelor II, who succeeded his father,
- Gruffudd Iâl, died 1238
- Maredudd, died 1256
- Hywel, died 1268
- Madog Fychan, died 1269
- Angharad. Her father tried to marry her to Fulk, son of Marcher Lord Fulk FitzWarin.

Regnal titles
Preceded by Gruffydd Maelor I	Prince of Powys Fadog; 1191–1236	Succeeded by Gruffydd Maelor II
