= Gruffudd Maelor (died 1191) =

Prince of Powys Fadog

Arms of Gruffydd Maelor

Gruffydd Maelor (died 1191) was a Prince of Powys Fadog in Wales. He married a daughter of King Owain Gwynedd, first Prince of Wales, and was a brother of Prince Owain Brogyntyn, ancestor of the Barons of Cymmer-yn-Edeirnion.

== Lineage ==
Maelor was a son of Prince Madog ap Maredudd by Susanna, daughter of King Gruffudd ap Cynan of the House of Aberffraw. He is known as Gruffydd Maelor I to distinguish him from his grandson, Gruffydd Maelor II, Lord of Dinas Bran.

He was to be the founder of the principal ruling family of northern Powys during the 13th century.

== Inheritance ==
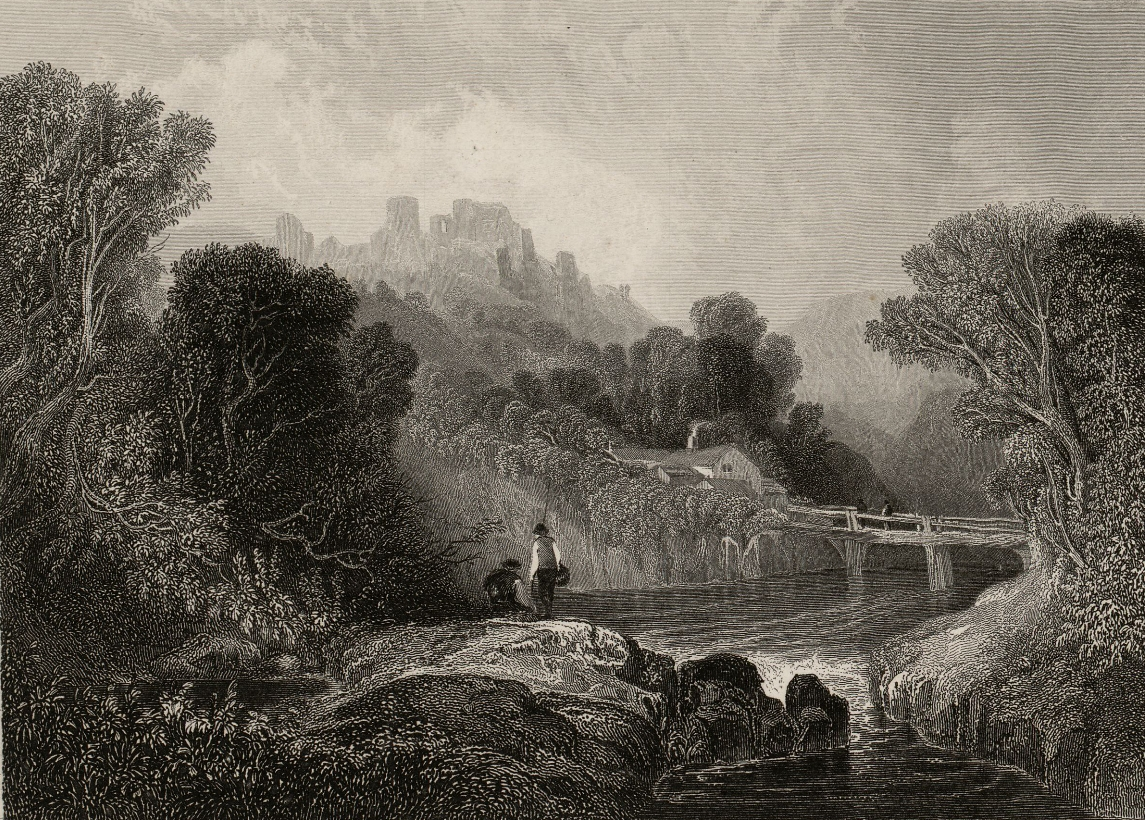
Painting of Castell Dinas Bran, North Wales, in Powys Fadog

On his father's death in 1160 Powys was divided between his three sons (Gruffydd, Owain Brogyntyn and Owain Fychan), a nephew (Prince Owain Cyfeiliog) and a half-brother (Prince Iorwerth Goch ap Maredudd).

Gruffydd received the Lordship of Maelor (also known as Bromfield) and the Lordship of Iâl (also known as Yale), as his allotted portion of Powys.

These lordships later merged and became the Lordship of Bromfield and Yale, belonging to John de Warenne, 6th Earl of Surrey, who was later defeated at the Battle of Stirling Bridge by William Wallace.

Gruffydd later added Nanheudwy, Cynllaith Owain and Mochnant Is Rhaeadr after the death of his half-brother Owain Fychan in 1187.

== Unification of northern Powys ==
His inherited and acquired lands in effect unified and reunited most of northern Powys forming what became known as Powys Fadog after it was inherited by his son.

== Marriage ==
He married Princess Angharad, his cousin, and daughter of Owain Gwynedd, King of Gwynedd.

== Death and issue ==
He died in 1191, leaving issue:

- Madog, who succeeded his father.
- Owen, joint ruler with his brother, died 1197.

== References and sources ==
- Prof. T Jones Pierce MA FSA, The History of Wales (Aberystwyth)
- Lloyd, History of Wales

Specific

Regnal titles
Preceded by Madog ap Maredudd	Prince of Powys Fadog; 1160–1191 at times with brothers or nephews	Succeeded by Madog ap Gruffydd Maelor
