= Brogyntyn Castle =

Ruined castle on the Anglo-Welsh border

Coordinates: 52°52′25″N 3°04′19″W

Brogyntyn Castle (Welsh: Castell Brogyntyn) is a ruin of a native Welsh castle found close to Selattyn, Shropshire, England, on the Anglo-Welsh border. It is thought the castle was built, or at least owned, by Owain Brogyntyn, a 12th Century prince of the kingdom of Powys. Very little of the castle now remains.

The antiquarian resource book Earthwork of England, prehistoric, Roman, Saxon, Danish, Norman and medieval (1908) states:

"Brogyntyn Castle, near Oswestry, is a perfectly round moated site, the external diameter 290 feet, the internal 160 feet, and the fosse having a width of 65 feet."

Brogyntyn castle formerly belonged to Owain Brogyntyn, the natural son of Prince Madog ab Meredydd.
