= Hender =

Hender is both a masculine given name and a surname. Notable people with the name include:

- Taylar Hender (born 1998), American actress
- Hender Molesworth (died 1689), British diplomat and Governor of Jamaica
- Hender Robartes (1635–1688), English politician

== See also ==
- Henders
