= Owain Brogyntyn =

Prince of Powys

Arms attributed to Owain Brogyntyn

Owain Brogyntyn ap Madog (fl. 1160–1186) was prince of Powys and the third and illegitimate son of king Madog ap Maredudd, the last king of a united Kingdom of Powys. He was the son of Madog by the daughter of the Maer du or "black mayor" of Rûg in Edeyrnion however some sources cite his mother as Susanna making him legitimate instead. He was the brother of prince Gruffydd Maelor, ancestor of prince Owain Glyndŵr.

Presumably Owain Brogyntyn would have been raised by his mother at Rûg in Edeyrnion. He was acknowledged by his father and granted by him the lordship of Edeyrnion and also Dinmael. It is quite possible that he inherited some of these lands through his maternal grandfather, the Maer Du, which were confirmed and perhaps extended by his father the king of Powys. At some point he also came into possession of Castle Brogyntyn on the English borders at Selattyn close to Oswestry.

In 1160 after the death of his father and his eldest half-brother, he inherited a share of the Kingdom of Powys - specifically, the cantref of Penllyn (which included Edeyrnion and Dinmael). The military skill and strength of Madog had prevented Owain Gwynedd (the ruling Prince of Gwynedd) from asserting hegemony over Powys, but following Madog's death, Owain Gwynedd was able to force Owain Brogyntyn to become his vassal; as a consequence, Penllyn became part of Gwynedd.

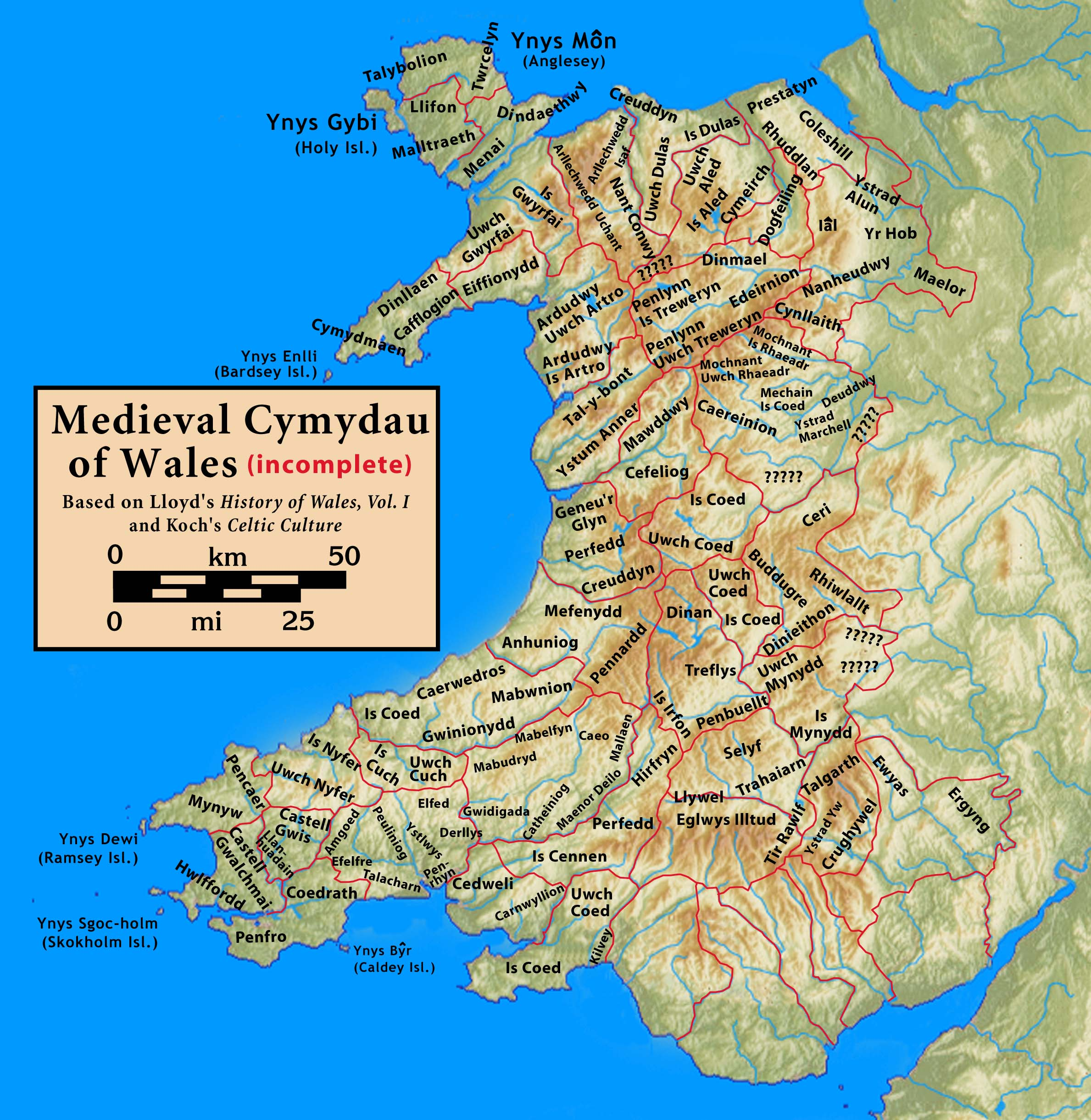
Medieval commotes of Wales, showing the commote of Penllyn, toward the north

Owain first married Jonet verch Hywel (whose ancestor was Athelstan Glodrudd of the Fifth Royal Tribe) but with her had no children. He next married Marred ferch Einion ap Seisyllt who was to be the mother of his three sons, Bleddyn, Gruffydd, Iorwerth. Bleddyn on the death of his father was made Lord of Dinmael, some notable descendants patrilineally of Bleddyn are the Wynn's of Dudleston descended from Howell second son of Owain ap Bleddyn whose coat of arms is the black lion rampart on an Ardent(Silver)shield, who were living in 1634 with the descendant of the family known as Morgan Wynn Barrister at Law living in the parish of Dudleston at the Estate inherited by the family through an earlier marriage, the Pentre Morgan property. He also had two younger brother Richard and Thomas Wynn.

His eldest son, Gruffydd ap Owain Brogyntyn, inherited half the Lordship of Edeirnion centred on Hendwr, and his eldest son Dafydd ap Gruffydd was created Baron of Hendwr by Edward I for supporting his cause.

His youngest son, Iorwerth ab Owain Brogyntyn, who inherited half the Lordship of Edeirnion, married Efa verch Madoc the sole heir of Madoc, Lord of Mawddwy (the younger son of Gwenwynwyn, prince of Powys Wenwynwyn). The son of Iorwerth and Efa, Gruffudd ab Iorwerth, was confirmed in his lands as Baron of Kymmer-yn-Edeirnion by Edward I under the terms of the Statute of Rhuddlan by which England organised the subjugation of Wales.

According to Philip York writing in 1799 a cup and a dagger belonging to Owain Brogyntyn were preserved at Rûg in Edeyrnion. Later accounts in the National Gazetteer dated 1868 state that a cup and dagger in the possession of "Colonel Vaughan of Rhug" were once owned by another Owain of Powys, the much later Owain Glyndŵr. These objects, whoever the original owner, may now be lost.
