= Statute of Rhuddlan =

1284 decree by King Edward I establishing the Principality of Wales

Statuta Wallie
- Act of Parliament
- Parliament of England
- Long title: None
- Citation: 12 Edw. 1
- Territorial extent: England and Wales; Ireland

Dates
- Royal assent: 1284
- Commencement: 1284
- Repealed: 16 September 1887
Other legislation
Repealed by	Statute Law Revision Act 1887
Relates to	Laws in Wales Act 1535; Laws in Wales Act 1542

Status: Repealed

Text of statute as originally enacted

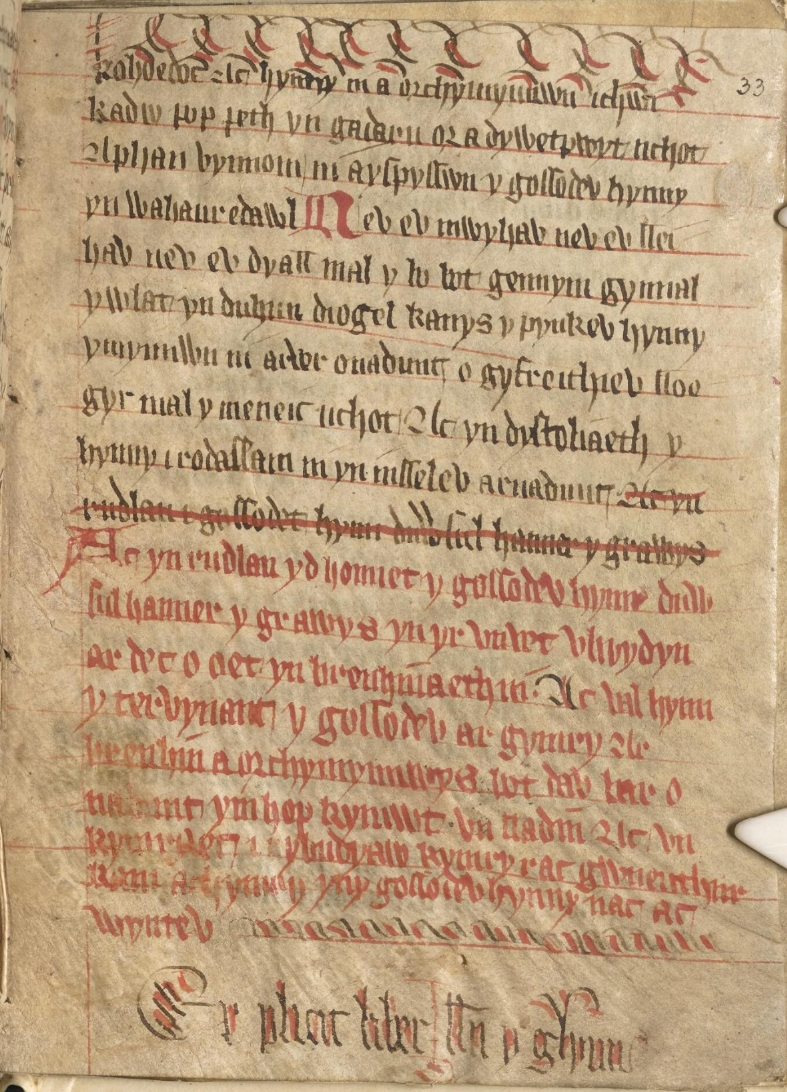
Page from Peniarth MS 41, a 15th-century manuscript of the Statute of Rhuddlan in Welsh

The Statute of Rhuddlan (Note: The name Statute of Rutland has been used erroneously by older authors, including in Blackstone's Commentaries on the Laws of England; that name properly refers to an unrelated statute made the same year at Rutland in England.) (Welsh: Statud Rhuddlan), also known as the Statutes of Wales (Latin: Statuta Walliae or Valliae) or as the Statute of Wales (Latin: Statutum Walliae or Valliae), was a royal ordinance by Edward I of England, which gave the constitutional basis for the government of the Principality of Wales from 1284 until 1536.

The statute followed the Conquest of Wales by Edward I and the killing of the last Welsh prince to rule the whole Principality, Llywelyn ap Gruffudd in 1282. The statute introduced English common law to Wales, but also permitted the continuance of Welsh legal practices within the Principality. The statute also introduced the English shire system to the Principality of Wales. Prior to the statute, the Welsh principalities were ruled by Welsh law and the native Princes of Wales.

== Background ==
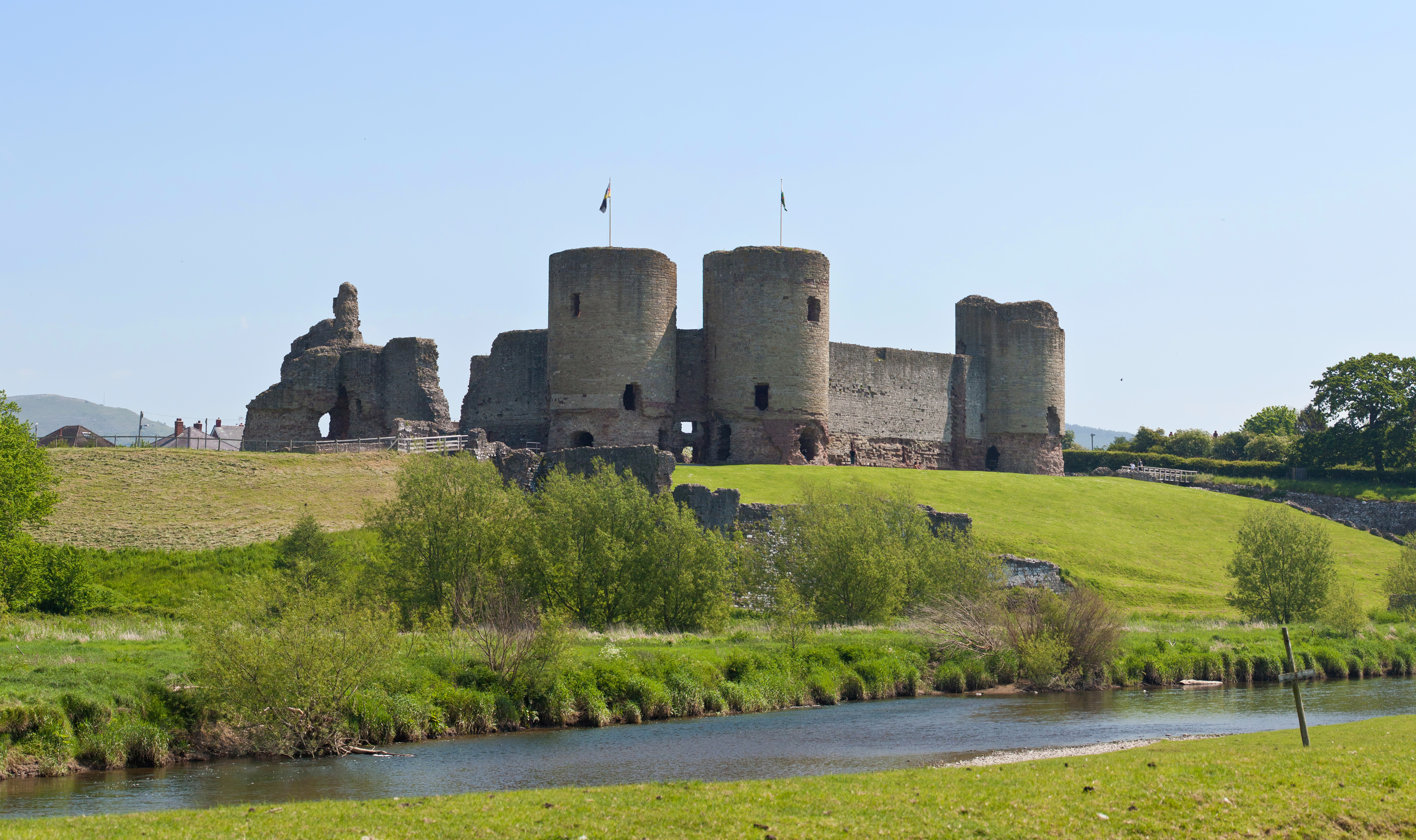
Rhuddlan Castle

The Prince of Gwynedd had been recognised by the English Crown as Prince of Wales in 1267, holding his lands with the king of England as his feudal overlord. It was thus that the English interpreted the title of Llywelyn ap Gruffudd, Lord of Aberffraw, which was briefly held after his death by his successor Dafydd ap Gruffudd. This meant that when Llywelyn rebelled, the English interpreted it as an act of treason. Accordingly, his lands escheated to the king of England, and Edward I took possession of the Principality of Wales by military conquest from 1282 to 1283. By this means the principality became "united and annexed" to the Crown of England.

Following his conquest Edward I erected four new marcher lordships in northeast Wales: Chirk (Chirkland), Bromfield and Yale (Powys Fadog), Ruthin (Dyffryn Clwyd) and Denbigh (Lordship of Denbigh); and one in South Wales, Cantref Bychan. He restored the principality of Powys Wenwynwyn to Gruffydd ap Gwenwynwyn who had suffered at the hands of Llewelyn, and he and his successor Owen de la Pole held it as a marcher lordship. Rhys ap Maredudd of Dryslwyn would have been in a similar position in Cantref Mawr, having adhered to the king during Llewelyn's rebellion, but he forfeited his lands by rebelling in 1287. A few other minor Welsh nobles submitted in time to retain their lands, but became little more than gentry.

The English Crown already had a means of governing South Wales in the honours of Carmarthen and Cardigan, which went back to 1240. These became counties under the government of the Justiciar of South Wales (or of West Wales), who was based in Carmarthen. The changes of the period made little difference in the substantial swathe of land from Pembrokeshire through South Wales to the Welsh Borders which was already in the hands of the marcher lords. Nor did they alter the administration of the royal lordships of Montgomery and Builth, which retained their existing institutions.

== Statute ==
The statute also divided Wales into administrations of government via shires which were essentially provinces of the English crown. Prior to the statute, the Welsh principalities were ruled by Welsh law and the native Princes of Wales, the last prince to rule the whole Principality being Llywelyn ap Gruffudd, killed in an ambush by the English in 1282.

The statute was not an act of Parliament, but rather a royal ordinance made after careful consideration by Edward I on 3 March 1284. It takes its name from Rhuddlan Castle in Denbighshire where it was first promulgated on 19 March 1284. The Statute was superseded by the Laws in Wales Acts 1535 and 1542 when Henry VIII made Wales unequivocally part of the "realm of England".

The statute was formally repealed by section 1 of, and the schedule to, the Statute Law Revision Act 1887 (50 & 51 Vict. c. 59).

=== Counties ===
Map of Wales after the Statute of Rhuddlan. Former principality of Gwynedd with counties created by the Statute of Rhuddlan Counties created by the Statute of Rhuddlan Lordships of the Marcher barons

The Statute of Rhuddlan was issued from Rhuddlan Castle in North Wales, one of the "iron ring" of fortresses built by Edward I to control his newly conquered lands. It provided the constitutional basis for the government of what was called "The Land of Wales" or "the king's lands of Snowdon and his other lands in Wales", but subsequently called the "Principality of North Wales". The Statute divided the principality into the counties of Anglesey, Merionethshire, Caernarfonshire, and Flintshire, which were created out of the remnants of the Kingdom of Gwynedd in North Wales. Flintshire was created out of the lordships of Tegeingl, Hopedale, and Maelor Saesneg. It was administered with the Palatinate of Cheshire by the Justiciar of Chester.

The other three counties were overseen by a Justiciar of North Wales and a provincial exchequer at Caernarfon, run by the Chamberlain of North Wales, who accounted to the Exchequer at Westminster for the revenues he collected. Under them were royal officials such as sheriffs, coroners, and bailiffs to collect taxes and administer justice. The king had ordered an inquiry into the rents and other dues to which the princes had been entitled, and these were enforced by the new officials. At the local level, commotes became hundreds, but their customs, boundaries and offices remained largely unchanged.

=== Law ===
The Statute introduced the English common law system to Wales, but the law administered was not precisely the same as in England. The criminal law was much the same, with felonies such as murder, larceny and robbery prosecuted before the justiciar, as in England. The English writs and forms of action, such as novel disseisin, debt and dower, operated, but with oversight from Caernarfon, rather than the distant Westminster. However, the Welsh practice of settling disputes by arbitration was retained. The procedure for debt was in advance of that in England, in that a default judgment could be obtained. In land law, the Welsh practice of partible inheritance continued, but in accordance with English practice:

- Daughters could inherit their father's lands if there was no son.
- Widows were entitled to dower in a third of their late husband's lands.
- Bastards were excluded from inheriting.

== Building ==
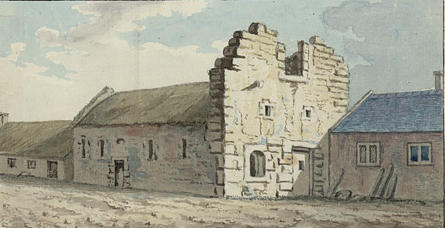
Edward I Parliament House, Rhuddlan, 1238

The Parliament House of Edward III in Rhuddlan where it was thought that the Statute of Rhuddlan was promulgated. Thomas Pennant remarks in 1778, "A piece of antient building called the Parlement is still to be seen in Rhuddlan: probably where the king sat in council." Pennant was to get John Ingleby to provide a watercolour of the building. Today the building still partially stands in Parliament Street, with a late 13th-century doorway and a 14th-century cusped ogee door head.

== Sources ==
Primary

- Bowen, Ivor (1908). The statutes of Wales. London: T. Fisher Unwin. pp. 2–27
- Ruffhead, Owen, ed. (1765). "Statutum Wallie". The Statutes at Large (in Latin). Vol. 9. London: Mark Basket; Henry Woodfall & William Stratham. Appendix pp. 3–12.

Secondary

- Bowen 1908, pp. xxviii–xl
- Davies, R. R. (2000). "14: Settlement". The Age of Conquest: Wales 1063–1415. Oxford: Oxford University Press. ISBN 0-19-820878-2.
