= Northern Powys (medieval) =

Northern realm of Powys

Coordinates: 52.97909°N 3.15903°W

Northern Powys Powys Fadog (Welsh)
- 1160 – 1284
- Banner of Northern Powys Coat of Arms of Northern Powys

- The divisions of Powys in about 1200
- Capital: Castell Dinas Brân
- Common languages: Middle Welsh
- Government: Monarchy
  - 1160–1191: Gruffudd Maelor (I)
  - 1191–1236: Madog (I)
  - 1236–1269: Gruffudd Maelor (II)
  - 1269–1277: Madog (II)
  - 1277–1282: Gruffudd ap Madog
  - 1282: Llywelyn Fychan ap Gruffudd
- Historical era: Middle Ages
  - Death of Madog ap Maredudd and Llywelyn ap Madog: 1160
  - Statute of Rhuddlan: 1284
Preceded by	Succeeded by
Kingdom of Powys	Welsh Marches
- Today part of: Wales

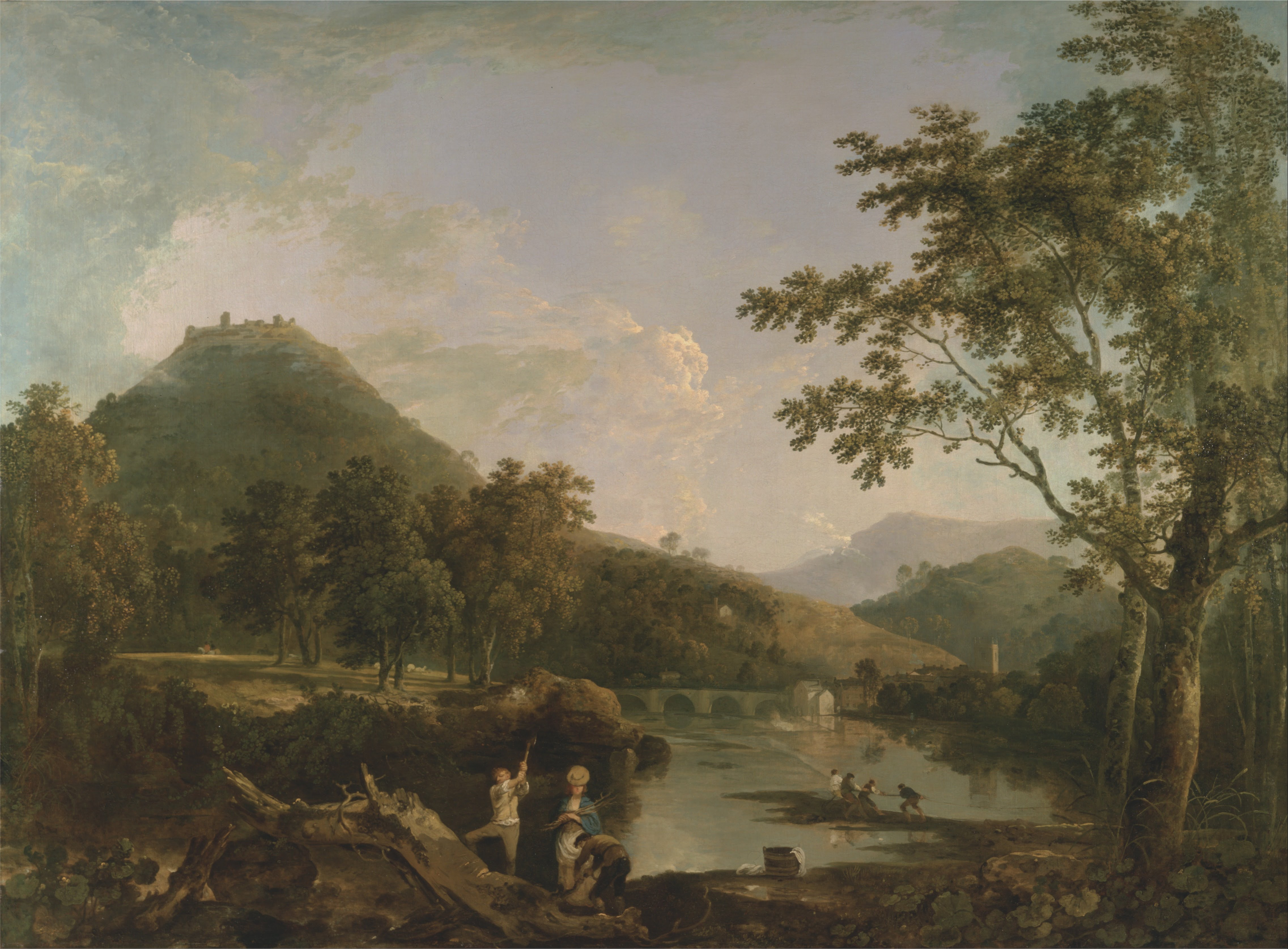
Dinas Bran from Llangollen by Richard Wilson, 1771. Painting of Castle Dinas Bran, was the royal seat of the princes of Powys Fadog

Northern Powys or Powys Fadog (Welsh for 'Madog's Powys'), was the northern portion of the Kingdom of Powys following that kingdom's dissolution in 1160. The lords of northern Powys had their royal seat at Castell Dinas Brân and their religious center at Valle Crucis Abbey. Some of its lordships included those of Maelor, Mochnant, Glyndyfrdwy, Yale, and Bromfield and Yale.

Following the division of Powys, their cousin branch, the princes of Powys Wenwynwyn, had their seat at Powis Castle. The principality's first prince was Gruffydd Maelor I, and its last sovereign prince was Madog II ap Gruffydd, following the Conquest of Wales by king Edward Longshanks.

== History ==
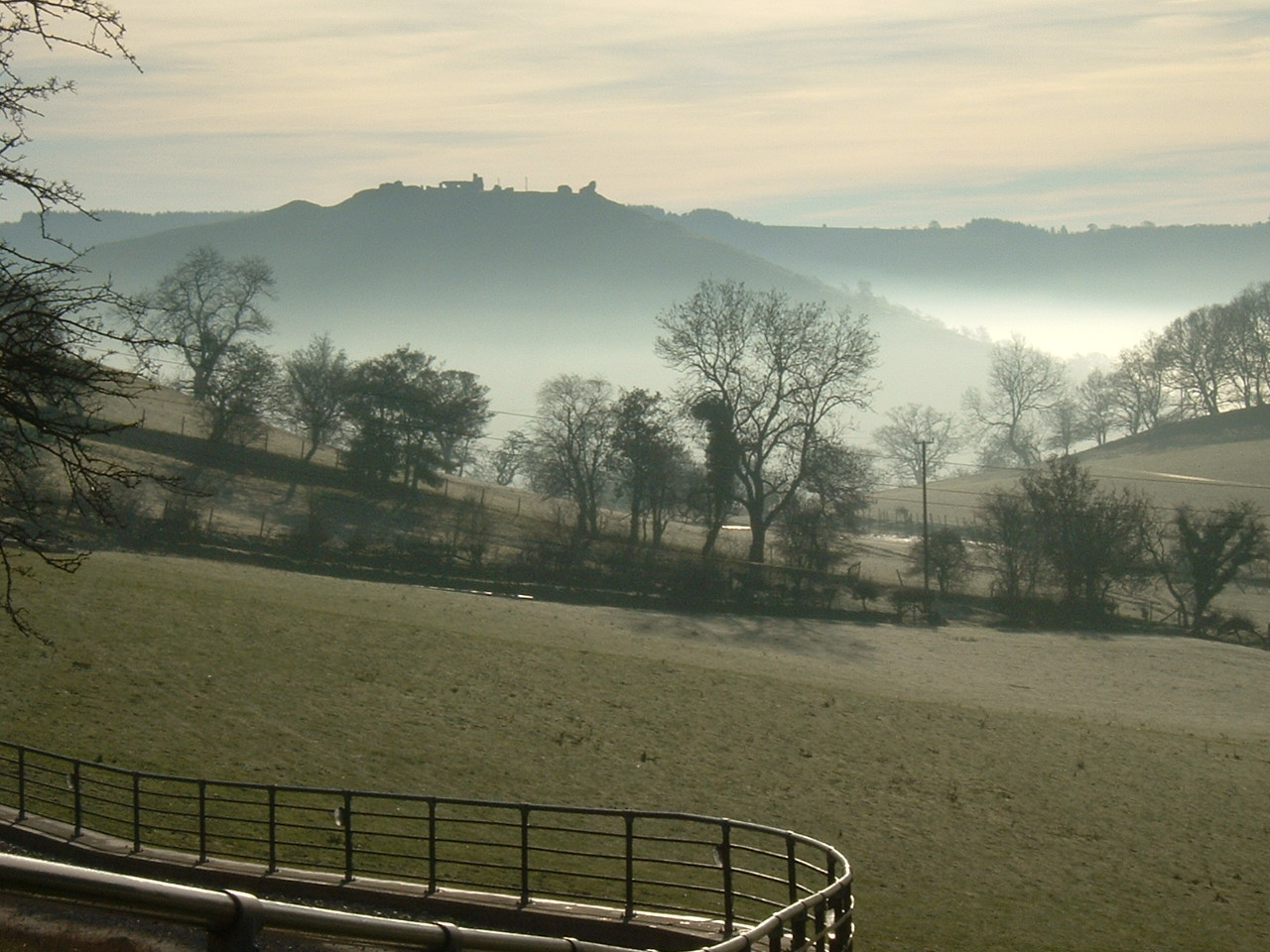
Dinas Brân (top left), the capital of northern Powys viewed from the north west

Powys split in two in 1160 following the death of Prince Madog ap Maredudd. He was a member of the Royal House of Mathrafal, founded by grandfather, King Bleddyn ap Cynfyn, who led a defence with the Anglo-Saxons against William the Conqueror. Madog would lose for a time the Lordship of Yale when he allied himself with Ranulf de Gernon, 4th Earl of Chester, against King Owain Gwynedd. The realm of Powys was divided under Welsh law: Madog's nephew prince Owain Cyfeiliog inheriting the south (see Powys Wenwynwyn) and his son prince Gruffydd Maelor I inherited the north.

Gruffydd received the cantref of Maelor and the commote of Yale (Iâl) as his portion, and later added Nanheudwy, Cynllaith, Glyndyfrdwy and Mochnant Is Rhaeadr. This northern realm became known as Powys Fadog after the accession in 1191 of his son prince Madog ap Gruffudd, who reigned until 1236, and after whom it may be named (see alternative translations above). During his reign, Madog initially adopted a neutral position between Gwynedd and England, but by 1215 he had settled on an alliance with king Llywelyn ab Iorwerth of Gwynedd.

This policy of alliance with Gwynedd altered under his successor Gruffudd II over his thirty-three year reign (1236–1269); pressure from an ambitious Gwynedd, and Gruffydd's marriage to the daughter of an English landowner, caused him to seek support from the English king Henry III. However, support from England failed to arrive, and in 1258 he was forced into an alliance with prince Llywelyn ap Gruffudd. Gruffydd's influence waned and Llywelyn was recognised as Prince of Wales under the terms of the 1267 Treaty of Montgomery; Gruffydd subsequently confined himself to building his castle, Castell Dinas Brân.

When Gruffydd died in 1269, his eldest son prince Madog II succeeded to the throne, but the small portion of the realm awarded to his younger brothers caused rebellion, in which England became engaged. By 1276 northern Powys was in disorder, with brother fighting brother, and this conflagration soon became a small part in the campaign being waged by the English Crown against the fragile Welsh confederation. In early 1277 an army led by William de Beauchamp, 9th Earl of Warwick of Warwick Castle, with support from the treacherous brother of Llywelyn ap Gruffudd, prince Dafydd ap Gruffydd, marched from Chester into northern Powys.

Madog II was compelled to submit: under the terms of his surrender the realm would be divided between himself and his younger brother Llywelyn. The royal seat of the Princes of northern Powys, Castle Dinas Brân, widely considered the strongest native castle in all Wales, was to be had by neither, and was dismantled.

Their cousin branch, the Princes of Powys Wenwynwyn, had their royal seat at Powis Castle. It appears that prince Madog II (or at least men loyal to him) remained at Dinas Brân for some time after this accord, because Henry de Lacy, Earl of Lincoln commanded an English force to take the castle on 10 May 1277. Before they could complete their encirclement of the royal centre they learnt that the small garrison inside had abandoned the cause and burnt the castle. Madog II was forced to flee to the protection of Gwynedd. He was killed in battle while campaigning alongside Llywelyn ap Gruffudd later that same year. The Castle of Dinas Brân would be slighted; its dramatic ruins may still be seen today.

His surviving brothers Llywelyn Fychan and prince Gruffudd Fychan I accepted the overlordship of England, and the realm was divided between them. Special provision was also made for the two sons of Madog II. However, in 1282, during the final campaign of Llywelyn ap Gruffudd, all of the rulers of northern Powys would once again turn against England in a final conflict during which Llywelyn ap Gruffudd, Llywelyn Fychan and the two sons of Madog II would all die. Under the terms of the Statute of Rhuddlan in 1284 all of the remaining former princely titles and territories in Wales were abolished. Gruffydd Fychan (the brother of Madog II and last heir to the throne of northern Powys) was pardoned but reduced in status to a minor local noble or uchelwr. His direct descendant, Owain Glyndŵr, would become the leader of a later Welsh rebellion in 1400 named the Glyndŵr rising.

The territory of northern Powys was broken up into a series of lordships based on the former cantrefi. Under the Statute of Rhuddlan these marcher lordships were merged with other adjacent lands formerly part of Gwynedd, and incorporated into new administrative counties: the cantrefi of Maelor, Nanheudwy, Iâl, Cynllaith and Mochnant Is Rhaeadr went to Denbighshire, and Maelor Saesneg formed the Wrexham exclave of Flintshire. This situation was maintained until the reorganisation of local government in Wales in 1974. The principality religious center was at Valle Crucis Abbey, built by Prince Madog ap Gruffydd Maelor, next to the Pillar of Eliseg, erected during the 800s by King Cyngen ap Cadell after a pilgrimage to Rome. It was the last Cistercian monastery to be founded in Wales.

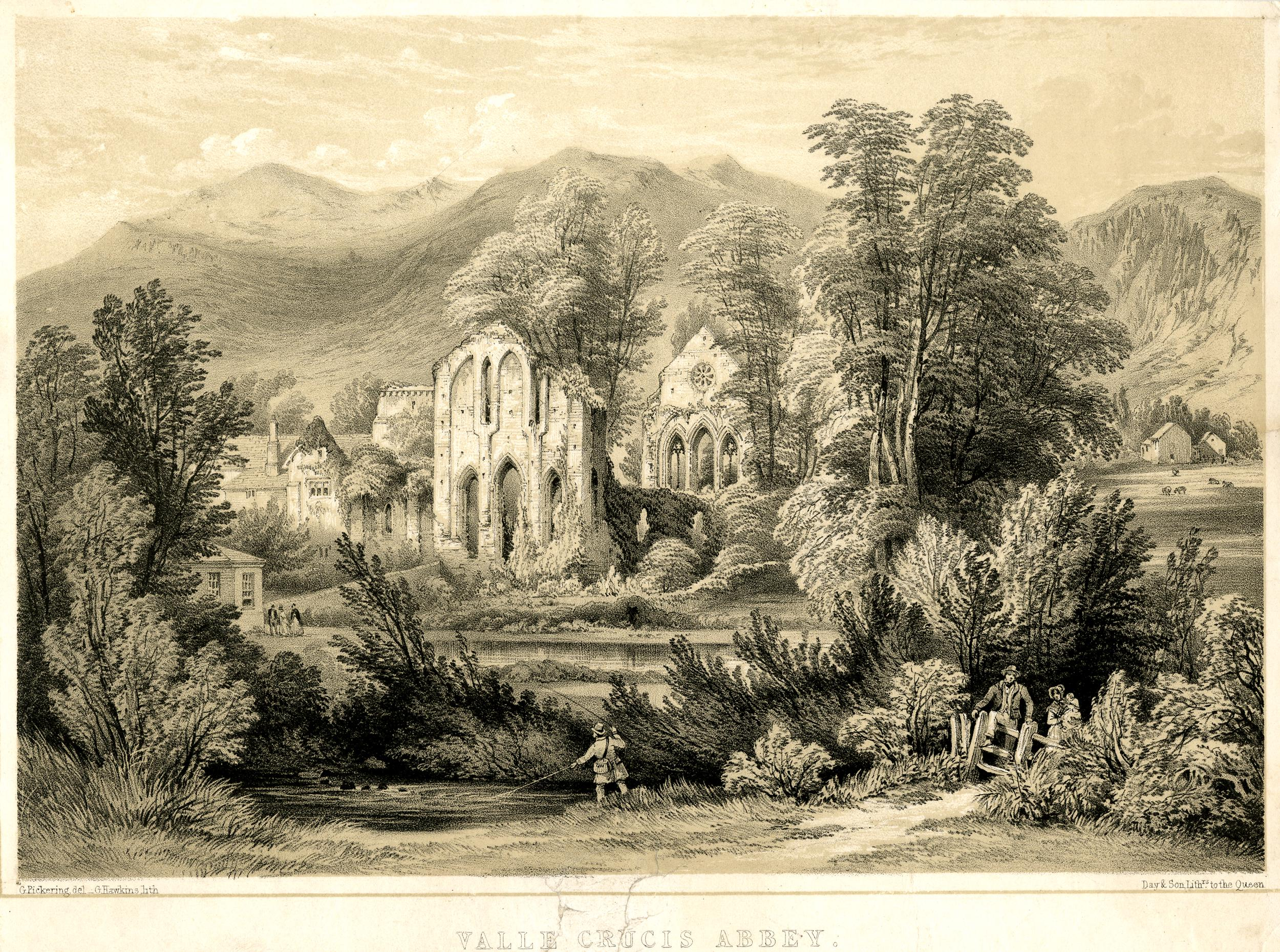
Valle Crucis Abbey, religious center of Powys Fadog
