= Madog ap Maredudd =

King of Powys from 1132 to 1160

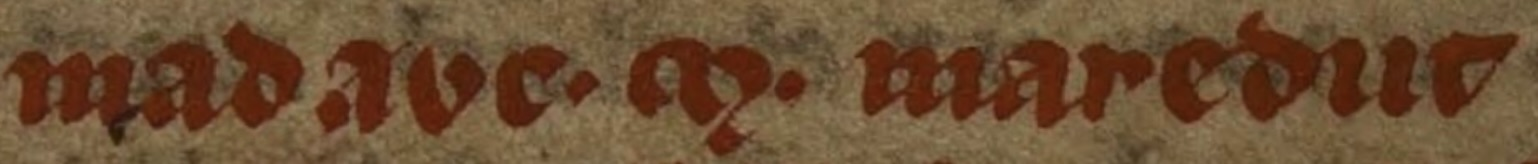
- Madog's name (madaỼc m[ap] maredut) in the rubrication to a poem sung to his war-band by Cynddelw, from NLW MS 6680B f. 62^{v}

King of Powys
- Reign: 1132 – c. 10 February 1160
- Predecessor: Maredudd ap Bleddyn
- Successor: Llywelyn ap Madog
- Died: c. 10 February 1160
- Burial: SS Tysilio and Mary, Meifod
- Spouse: Susanna ferch Gruffudd
- Issue: Llywelyn ap Madog; Gruffudd Maelor; Elise ap Madog; Gwenllian ferch Madog; Marared ferch Madog; Efa ferch Madog; Iorwerth ap Madog; Einion Efell; Cynwrig Efell; Owain Fychan; Owain Brogyntyn; Owain ap Madog; N.N. ferch Madog
- Dynasty: Lleision
- Father: Maredudd ap Bleddyn
- Mother: Hunydd ferch Einudd

Approximate extent of the Kingdom of Powys

Madog ap Maredudd (Welsh pronunciation: [ˈmadɔɡ ap ma'redɨːð], d. 1160) was king of Powys from 1132 to 1160.

== Early life ==
Madog was the son of King Maredudd ap Bleddyn and grandson of King Bleddyn ap Cynfyn. He followed his father on the throne of Powys in 1132. He is recorded as taking part in the Battle of Lincoln in 1141 in support of Ranulf de Gernon, 4th Earl of Chester, along with Owain Gwynedd's brother Cadwaladr ap Gruffydd and a large army of Welshmen. In 1149 he is recorded giving the commote of Cyfeiliog to his nephews Owain Cyfeiliog and Meurig.

The same year Madog was able to rebuild Oswestry Castle, a fortress of William Fitzalan. It would seem likely that he had gained both the fortresses of Oswestry and Whittington in 1146 of Fitzalan, the great-grandfather of the Earl of Arundel of Arundel Castle, John Fitzalan.

== Defeat by Gwynedd ==
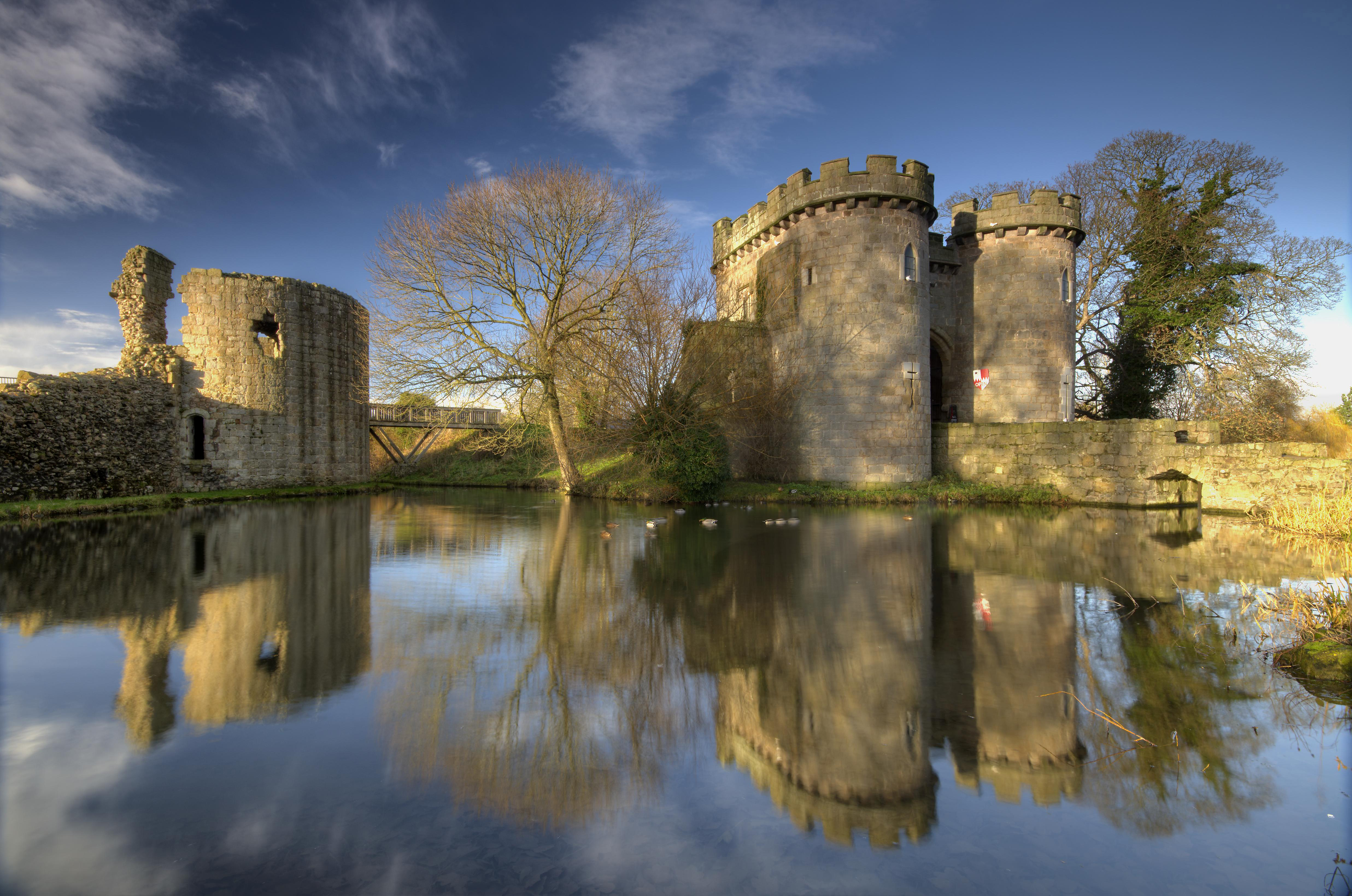
Whittington Castle, Shropshire, England

At this time, between 1149 and 1150, Owain, King of Gwynedd, was exerting pressure on the borders of Powys, despite the fact that Madog was married to Susanna, Owain's sister. In around 1150 Madog made an alliance with Ranulf de Gernon, 4th Earl of Chester, but Owain defeated them near Ewloe/Coleshill and took possession of Madog's lands in the Lordship of Iâl (English: Yale).

In 1157 King Henry II of England invaded Gwynedd. Though he was defeated at the Battle of Ewloe (Coleshill), he was supported by Madog, who was able to regain many of his Welsh lands. Even so, he retained the lordships of Oswestry and Whittington. In 1159 Madog would seem to have been the Welsh prince who accompanied Henry in his campaign to Toulouse, which ended in failure.

While returning home to Wales, Madog died about 9 February 1160 in Whittington Castle. He was buried soon afterwards in the church of St Tysilio at Meifod, the mother church of Powys.

== Succession Shared ==
Madog's eldest son, Llywelyn, was killed soon after his father's death in 1160; Powys was then shared between Madog's sons Gruffydd Maelor, Owain Fychan and Owain Brogyntyn, his nephew Owain Cyfeiliog and half-brother Iorwerth Goch. Powys was never subsequently reunited, being separated into two parts; Powys Fadog (Lower Powys) and Powys Wenwynwyn (Upper Powys). Madog's death enabled Owain Gwynedd to force the homage of Owain Brogyntyn, Madog's youngest son, and effectively annex part of northern Powys.

The poet Cynddelw Brydydd Mawr in his elegy on Madog said:

While Madog lived there was no man
Dared ravage his fair borders
Yet nought of all he held
Esteemed he his save by God's might…

If my noble lord were alive
Gwynedd would not now be encamped in the heart of Edeyrnion

Edeyrnion (or Edeirnion) was a commote inherited by Owain Brogyntyn and had been the home of his mother (who was not married to his father). Owain may also have been raised there. It was annexed to Gwynedd during Owain's time.

== Children ==
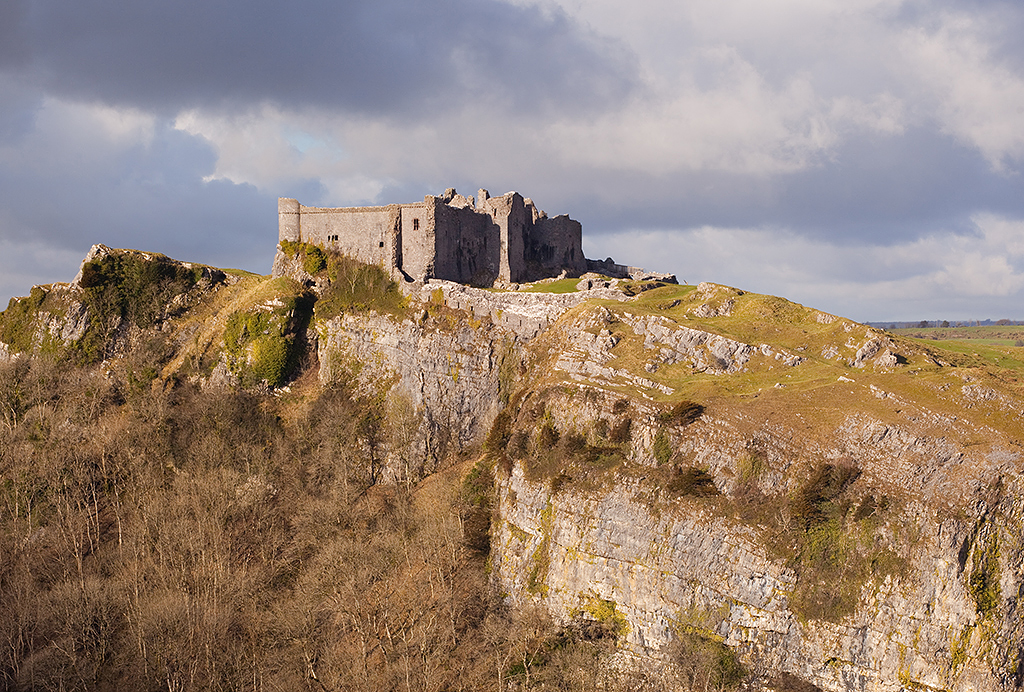
Carreg Cennen Castle of prince Rhys ap Gruffydd, who married the daughter of prince Madog

- Llywelyn ap Madog, died 1160
- Gruffydd Maelor ap Madog, died 1191
- Owain Fychan ap Madog, c. 1125–1187
- Owain Brogyntyn ap Madog (illegitimate)
- Gwenllian ferch Madog, married Rhys ap Gruffydd, prince of Deheubarth and Carreg Cennen Castle
- Marared ferch Madog, married Iorwerth Drwyndwn and was the mother of Llywelyn the Great
- Efa ferch Madog, married Cadwallon ap Madog ap Idnerth, prince of Maelienydd

== The Mabinogion ==
The Mabinogion tale The Dream of Rhonabwy is set during Madog's reign. The central character, Rhonabwy, is one of Madog's retainers sent to bring in Madog's rebellious brother Iorwerth Goch ap Maredudd. His titular dream contrasts his own time with the grandeur of King Arthur's period.

== Fiction ==
Madog's intervention in the Battle of Lincoln in 1141 forms an important plot element in the detective novel Dead Man's Ransom, part of the Brother Cadfael chronicles by Edith Pargeter (writing as Ellis Peters).

== Citations ==
Regnal titles
Preceded by Maredudd ap Bleddyn	King of Powys; 1132–1160	Succeeded by Llywelyn ap Madog
