= Edeirnion =

Historic area of Denbighshire, Wales

Coordinates: 52.947°N 3.417°W

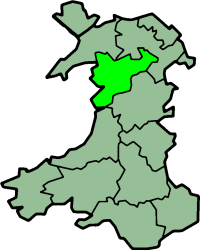
A map of Wales with Merionethshire highlighted. Edeirnion Rural District is the protrusion in the north east of Meirionnydd.

Edeirnion or Edeyrnion is an area of the county of Denbighshire and an ancient commote of medieval Wales in the cantref of Penllyn. According to tradition, it was named after its eponymous founder Edern or Edeyrn. It was included as a Welsh territory of Shropshire in the Domesday Book.

Edeirnion was nominally a part of the Kingdom of Powys but was often subject to border intrusions by the neighbouring Kingdom of Gwynedd. It was the patrimony of prince Owain Brogyntyn. These rumbling border disputes caused a great deal of friction between the two realms. Edeirnion was occupied and annexed by Gwynedd in the reign of Llywelyn the Great but briefly returned to Powys following a treaty forced on Gwynedd by England after Llywelyn's death in 1240. The territory was again occupied by Gwynedd after 1267 before being returned again to Powys. This continuing dispute and the appeal by Llywelyn ap Gruffudd to Edward I of England to see the resolution of this dispute settled by Welsh Law was one of the reasons the principalities in the north of Wales were unable to unite in opposition to English hegemony and was a contributing factor to the final war between the Principality of Wales and England, which ultimately saw the end of Welsh independence.

Edeirnion still exists as a bro, or region, in Denbighshire, located around Corwen and near the Berwyn Range.

== Edeirnion Rural District ==
Edeirnion Rural District was created under the Local Government Act 1894 from that part of Corwen Rural Sanitary District which was in the former administrative county of Merionethshire. It consisted of six civil parishes and covered 47,460 acres (192.1 km^{2}); it continued in existence until 1974, when it was abolished, as a result of the Local Government Act 1972, becoming part of the Glyndŵr District of Clwyd. In 1901 it had a population of 5,132, which had fallen to 3,925 by 1961. It was the only part of Merionethshire not included in the Meirionnydd District of Gwynedd. In 1996 Edeirnion became part of Denbighshire.

=== List of former civil parishes ===
Image	Name	Period	Population 1961	County	Community	Refs
	Betws Gwerfil Goch	1894; 1974	155	Denbighshire	Betws Gwerfil Goch	
	Corwen	1894; 1974	2,048	Denbighshire	Corwen	
	Gwyddelwern	1894; 1974	556	Denbighshire	Gwyddelwern	
	Llangar	1894; 1974	506	Denbighshire	Cynwyd	
	Llandrillo-yn-Edeirnion	1894; 1974	542	Denbighshire	Llandrillo	
	Llansanffraid Glyndyfrdwy	1894; 1974	118	Denbighshire	Corwen	
