= Montgomeryshire =

Historic county of Wales

Coordinates: 52°35′N 3°30′W

Montgomeryshire Sir Drefaldwyn (Welsh)
- Historic county and district
- 1536–1974/1996
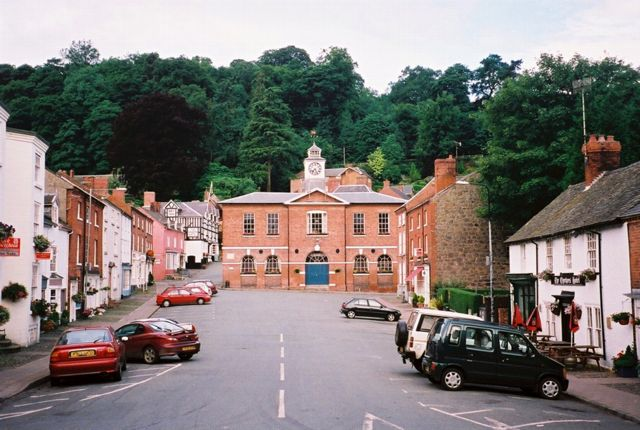
- Broad Street and Montgomery Town Hall (2001)

- Area
  - 1831: 483,323 acres (1,955.94 km^{2})
- Population
  - 1831: 66,482
  - 1992: 53,700
- Density
  - 1831: 0.1/acre
- History
  - Created: –
- Status: Non-administrative county (1536–1889); Administrative county (1889–1974); District of Powys (1974–1996); Historic county (non-administrative) (since 1996)
- Chapman code: MGY
- Government: Montgomeryshire County Council (1889–1974); Montgomeryshire District Council (1974–1996)
- History
  - Established: 1536
  - Council established: 1889
  - Disestablished: 1974/1996
  - District status: 1974–1996
Succeeded by
Powys

Montgomeryshire (Welsh: Sir Drefaldwyn 'the shire of Baldwin's town', or simply Maldwyn) was one of the thirteen counties of Wales that existed from 1536 until their abolition in 1974, later becoming a district of Powys from 1974 to 1996. It was named after its county town, Montgomery, which in turn was named after one of William the Conqueror's main counsellors, Roger de Montgomerie, who was the 1st Earl of Shrewsbury.

The area of what was Montgomeryshire, now constitutes the northern part of the county of Powys. The current area was 2,174 square km (839 square miles).

The largest town was Newtown, followed by Welshpool and Llanidloes.

== History ==
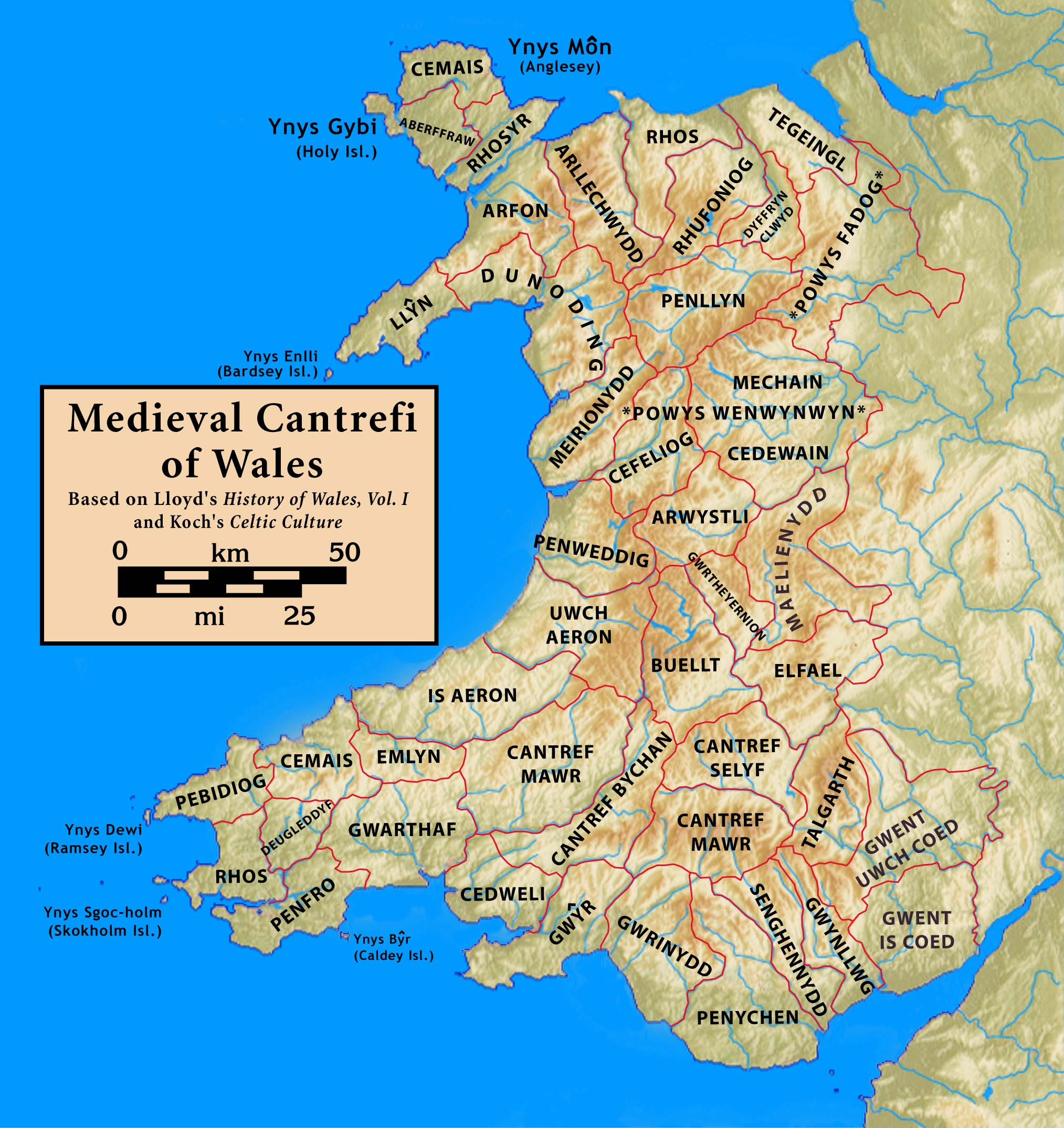
Map of Welsh cantrefs

The Treaty of Montgomery was signed on 29 September 1267, in the town of Montgomery, which had recently been established as an English incursion on the Welsh side of the border, to control a strategic border crossing. The surrounding region (on the Welsh side of the border) otherwise comprised the mediaeval principality of Powys Wenwynwyn, the southern of the two states into which the Kingdom of Powys had been divided a century before.

Attacks by Gwynedd on Powys Wenwynwyn led the latter to seek the assistance of the English. Ultimately this led them to convert their territory into a marcher lordship, via surrender and regrant, as a way to strengthen their position; the ruling princes of Powys Wenwynwyn became the Lords of Powys, feudally bound to the English king, and able to fully rely on English backing, but otherwise independent. The prince took an English-style surname - Owen de-la Pole - after his capital city, Pool (now Welshpool).

With the introduction of the Laws in Wales Acts 1535–1542 the marcher lordships were converted into English counties. The Lordship of Powys – the former Powys Wenwynwyn – became Montgomeryshire; the county town being Montgomery, the strongest centre of English authority in the region, rather than centre of Welsh authority, Welshpool. Montgomeryshire was thus ultimately formed from the cantrefi of Powys Wenwynwyn:

- Y Fyrnwy (commotes of Mochnant Uwch Rhaeadr, Mechain Is Coed and Llanerch Hudol)
- Llyswynaf (commotes of Caereinion and Mechain Uwch Coed)
- Ystlyg (commotes of Deuddwr, Ystrad Marchell and Y Gorddwr Isaf)
- Cedewain (commotes of Cynan, Cyfeiliog and Mawddwy)
- Arwystli (commotes of Arwystli Is Coed and Arwystli Uwch Coed)

In addition, for practical reasons, Montgomeryshire gained the commote of Ceri, which had formed a northwards spur of the less organised region Between Wye and Severn; most of the rest of the latter region became Radnorshire.

Montgomeryshire was bordered, to the north, by Denbighshire, to the east and south east by Shropshire, to the south by Radnorshire, to the south west by Cardiganshire, and to the west and north west by Merionethshire. When, in subsequent centuries, the concept of Wales was once again officially distinguished from England, all of these counties were deemed Welsh, except for Shropshire. Montgomeryshire was the birthplace of Welsh Catholic martyr Saint Richard Gwyn (in 1537).

The Welsh name for the county of Montgomery was Sir Drefaldwyn, leading to the shorter Welsh name Maldwyn.

=== Local government ===
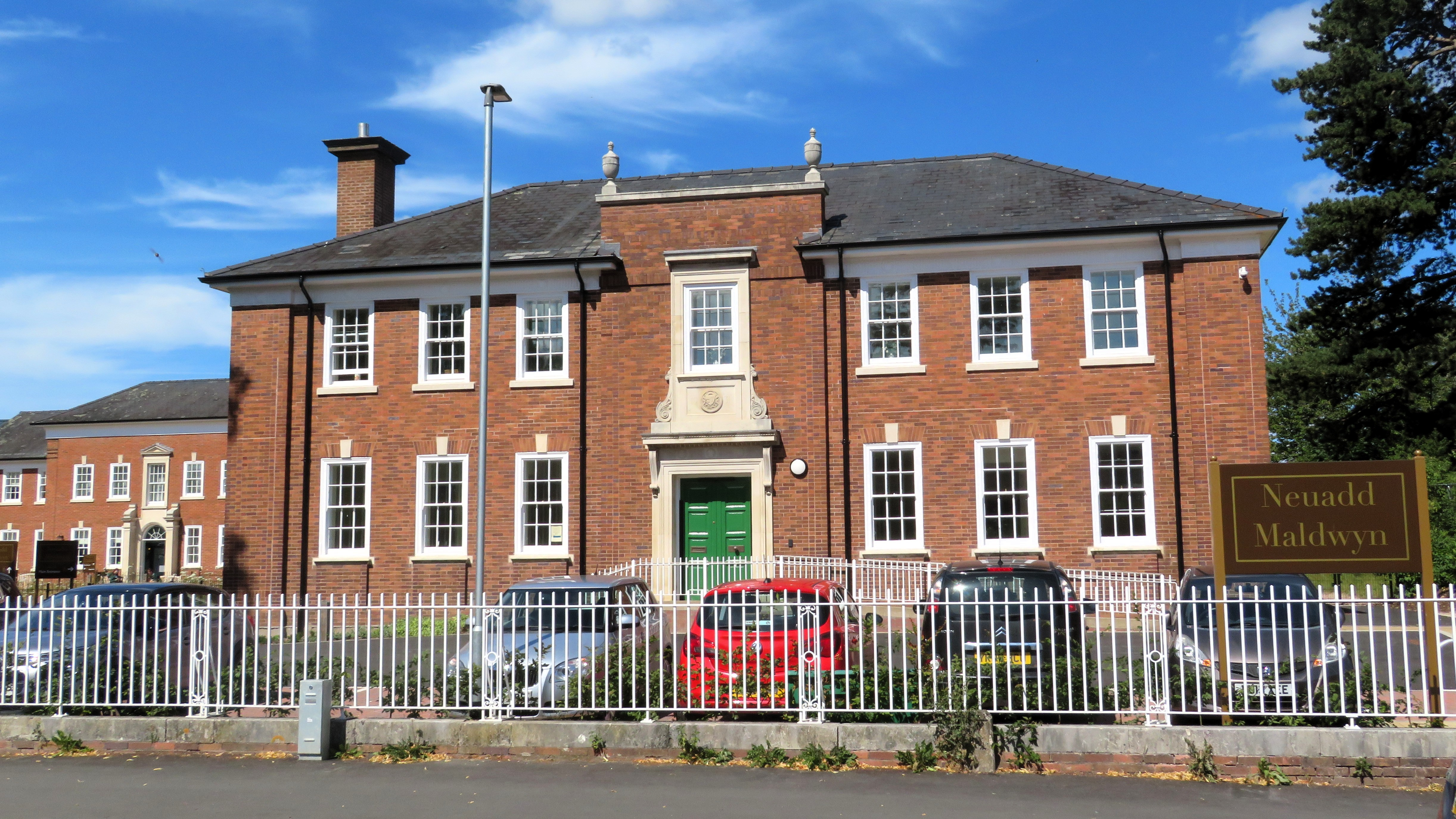
Neuadd Maldwyn, Severn Street, Welshpool: Built 1931 as headquarters of Montgomeryshire County Council

Elected county councils were established in 1889 under the Local Government Act 1888 to take over the local government functions previously exercised by the quarter sessions. Although the county was named after Montgomery, by 1889 the quarter sessions were instead held at both Newtown and Welshpool, and the new county council chose to continue meeting in both towns in its early years. Montgomeryshire County Council held its first formal meeting on 1 April 1889 at the Public Rooms (also known as the Flannel Exchange) in Newtown.

In 1931 the county council opened a new headquarters building in Welshpool, called the Montgomeryshire County Offices or Neuadd Maldwyn. The county council remained based at Neuadd Maldwyn until its abolition in 1974.

Until 1974, Montgomeryshire was divided into civil parishes for the purpose of local government; these in large part equated to ecclesiastical parishes (see the table below), most of which still exist as part of the Church in Wales.

Hundred	Parishes
Cawrse	Crugion/Criggion^{1} • Forden/Ffordun
Deythur	Llandrinio • Llandysilio • Llansanffraid-ym-Mechain
Llanfyllin	Hirnant • Llanfihangel-yng-Ngwynfa • Llanfyllin • Llangynog • Llanwddyn^{2} • Meifod • Pennant-melangell
Llanidloes	Carno • Llandinam • Llangurig • Llanidloes • Llanwnnog • Penystrywaid/Penstrowed • Trefeglwys
Machynlleth	Cemais/Cemmaes • Darowen • Llanbrynmair • Llanwrin • Machynlleth • Penegoes
Mathrafal	Castell Caereinion/Castle Caereinion • Garthbeibio • Llanerfyl • Llanfair Caereinion • Llangadfan • Llangynyw
Montgomery	Ceri/Kerry • Churchstoke/Yr Ystog • Hyssington/Isatyn • Mochdre • Montgomery/Trefaldwyn • Snead
Newtown	Aberhafesb/Aberhafesp • Aberriw/Berriew • Betws Cedewain/Bettws Cedewain • Llandysul/Llandyssil • Llanllugan • Llanllwchaearn • Llanmerewig • Llanwyddelan • Manafon • Newtown/Y Drenewydd • Tregynon
Pool	Buttington/Tal-y-bont • Cegidfa/Guilsfield • Llanfechain • Y Trallwng/Welshpool

^{1}a chapelry to Alberbury in Shropshire ^{2}a chapelry to Llanrhaeadr-ym-Mochnant in Denbighshire

Local government reforms in 1974 combined the administrative areas of Montgomeryshire, Radnorshire and Brecknockshire together to form a new administrative county called Powys. A new district of Montgomeryshire was established as a lower-tier district authority within Powys, with the district's area matching the former administrative county. The district council took over Neuadd Maldwyn in Welshpool to serve as its headquarters, and also retained the former offices of the abolished Newtown and Llanllwchaiarn Urban District Council at Newtown Hall Park as an area office.

Further local government reform in 1996 abolished district councils in Wales, making Powys a unitary authority. From 1996 until 2018 Powys County Council had a Montgomeryshire area committee covering the former Montgomeryshire district plus three communities formerly in the Glyndŵr district of Clwyd (historically Denbighshire) which were transferred to Powys in 1996. The three area committees for the former counties were abolished in 2018.

== District ==
The district in Powys

Arms of Montgomeryshire District Council

The district was formed as Montgomery on 1 April 1974 under the Local Government Act 1972. It covered the administrative county of Montgomeryshire, which was abolished at the same time. The new district replaced the previous ten district level authorities in Montgomeryshire:

- Forden Rural District
- Llanfyllin Municipal Borough
- Llanfyllin Rural District
- Llanidloes Municipal Borough
- Machynlleth Rural District
- Machynlleth Urban District
- Montgomery Municipal Borough
- Newtown and Llanllwchaiarn Urban District
- Newtown and Llanidloes Rural District
- Welshpool Municipal Borough

The council formally changed the district's name from Montgomery to Montgomeryshire with effect from 1 January 1986.

The district was abolished by the Local Government (Wales) Act 1994, with its functions transferring to Powys County Council on 1 April 1996.

=== Political control ===
The first election to the council was held in 1973, initially operating as a shadow authority before coming into its powers on 1 April 1974. A majority of the seats on the council were held by independents throughout the council's existence.

Party in control	Years
Independent	1974–1996

=== District council premises ===
The council was based at Neuadd Maldwyn, the former headquarters of Montgomeryshire County Council, which had been built in 1931 on Severn Road in Welshpool. The council also had area offices in Llanidloes, Machynlleth and at Newtown Hall Park in Newtown. After the council's abolition in 1996 Neuadd Maldwyn and Newtown Hall Park served as area offices for Powys County Council. Neuadd Maldwyn closed in 2019, with Newtown Hall Park now serving as Powys County Council's main area office in the Montgomeryshire area.

== Geography ==
The area of what was Montgomeryshire was almost wholly mountainous, although there are some fertile valleys in the east. The highest point (county top) was Moel Sych at 826.7 metres (2,712 ft), whose summit lies at the triple county boundary point of Montgomeryshire, Denbighshire and Merionethshire in the Berwyn Mountains. The county top of Denbighshire, Cadair Berwyn at 832 metres (2,730 ft), was less than a kilometre away. Its main rivers were the River Severn (which flows east into Shropshire) and the River Dyfi (which flows west into the Irish Sea). The reservoir Lake Vyrnwy was built and supplies Liverpool.

The main towns were Machynlleth, Llanidloes, Montgomery, Newtown and Welshpool. The main industries were agriculture (mainly hill farming) and tourism, though there was also some forestry and light manufacturing. The population density was highest near the border with England and along the Severn valley. The county was closely linked to Shropshire, with many essential services for Montgomeryshire residents being located in the more densely populated town of Shrewsbury, such as acute health services at the Royal Shrewsbury Hospital.

The county flower of Montgomeryshire remains the Spergula arvensis (also called "corn spurrey"). The shire forms a vice-county for wildlife recording.

== Transport ==
The area that was Montgomeryshire is crossed from East to West by the Cambrian Line, a mainline passenger railway between Shrewsbury and Aberystwyth as well as Pwllheli with stations at Welshpool, Newtown, Caersws and Machynlleth.

The Welshpool and Llanfair Light Railway links Welshpool to Llanfair Caereinion.

=== Places of special interest ===
- Bryntail lead mine buildings near Llanidloes
- Centre for Alternative Technology at Llwyngwern near Machynlleth
- The Museum of Modern Art, Wales (MOMA) in Machynlleth
- Dolforwyn Castle near Abermule
- Montgomery Castle in Montgomery
- The Old Bell Museum in Montgomery
- Powis Castle near Welshpool
- The Robert Owen Museum in Newtown
- Trefeglwys Tumuli
- Mathrafal — the seat of the Welsh kings and princes of Powys
- Meifod
- Offa's Dyke

== Legacy ==
=== Politics ===
Montgomeryshire's name is used in the constituencies that represent the area today:

- Montgomeryshire and Glyndŵr, a constituency of the House of Commons of the Parliament of the United Kingdom since 2024, when it replaced Montgomeryshire, which had been the constituency since 1542.
- Montgomeryshire (Senedd constituency), a constituency of the Senedd (Welsh Parliament; Welsh: Senedd Cymru).

== See also ==
- Townships in Montgomeryshire
- Local government in Wales
- History of Wales
  - History of local government in Wales
- List of Lord Lieutenants of Montgomeryshire
- List of High Sheriffs of Montgomeryshire
