= Llanerchydol =

Hamlet in Powys, Wales

Coordinates: 52.6597°N 03.1763°W

- Hamlet
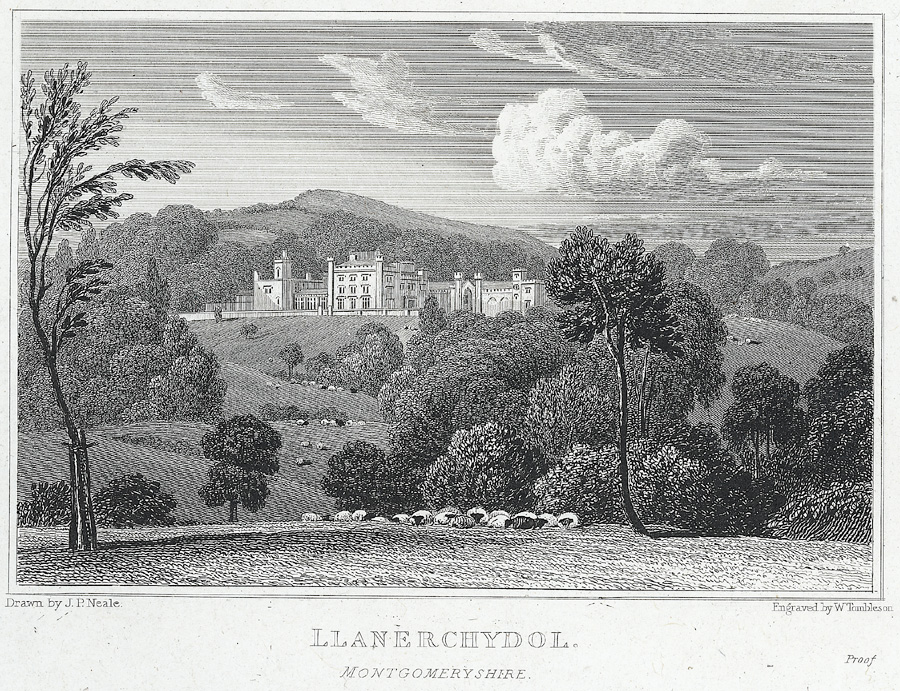
- Llanerchydol Hall

- Location within Powys
- Community: Welshpool
- Principal area: Powys
- Preserved county: Powys
- Country: Wales
- Sovereign state: United Kingdom
- Police: Dyfed-Powys
- Fire: Mid and West Wales
- Ambulance: Welsh

Llanerchydol is a hamlet in Powys, Wales, situated on the A458 about 2 km west of the centre of Welshpool. It is part of the community of Welshpool and also lends its name to an electoral ward of Welshpool Llanerchyddol.

== Llanerchydol Hall ==
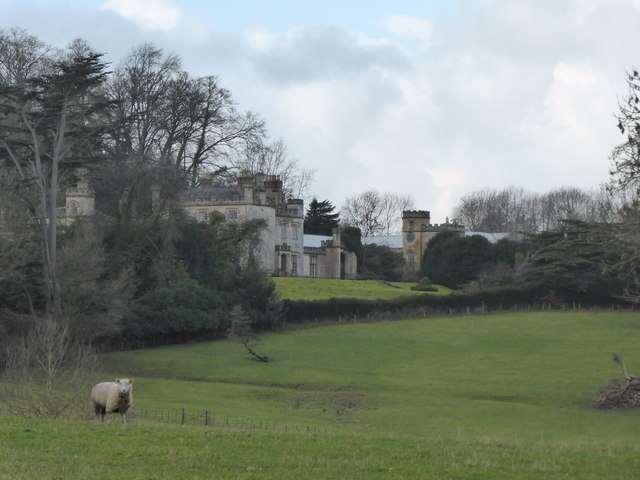
Llanerchydol Hall

Llanerchydol Hall is located in parkland between the A458 to Llanfair Caereinion and A490 to Llanfyllin. The hall, a 15,440 square feet (1,434 m^{2}) largely intact early 19th-century picturesque Gothic Revival house, is a Grade II* listed building, and its well preserved park and gardens are listed, also at Grade II*, on the Cadw/ICOMOS Register of Parks and Gardens of Special Historic Interest in Wales. The site has a long history of occupation, including a Tudor house which burnt down in about 1776, after which David Pugh, a local man who made a fortune selling tea in London, bought the site and built a new house which became known as Llanerchydol Hall.

David Pugh's great-grandnephew, also named David Pugh, inherited Llanerchydol Hall and became a local politician. During the 136 years of Pugh ownership, the house underwent many adaptations, including the introduction of the fairy-tale castellations and turrets in the Gothic Revival style (1820). John Repton was engaged to landscape the surrounding parkland and gardens and much of this may still be appreciated today. The original gardens included a Japanese Water Garden and parterre. Llanerchydol Hall is one of three grand houses in the area alongside Powis Castle and Vaynor Park and is Grade II* listed, along with the Repton parkland, which is listed in its own right.

The majority of the original 2000 acres of the Pugh Estate were sold off over time, culminating in the sale of the Hall itself in 1912 to a Liverpool cotton trader, Hugh Verdon. Hugh's daughters inherited Llanerchydol and the house remained in the Verdon family until 1985, when the last remaining daughter, Angela, died aged 97. The hall has been sold a few times since, with the 55 acres of Repton parkland no longer in the same ownership as the Hall. The house, in its current form is situated in approximately 5 acres of stunning countryside, within the protected Grade II* listed Repton parkland.

== History ==
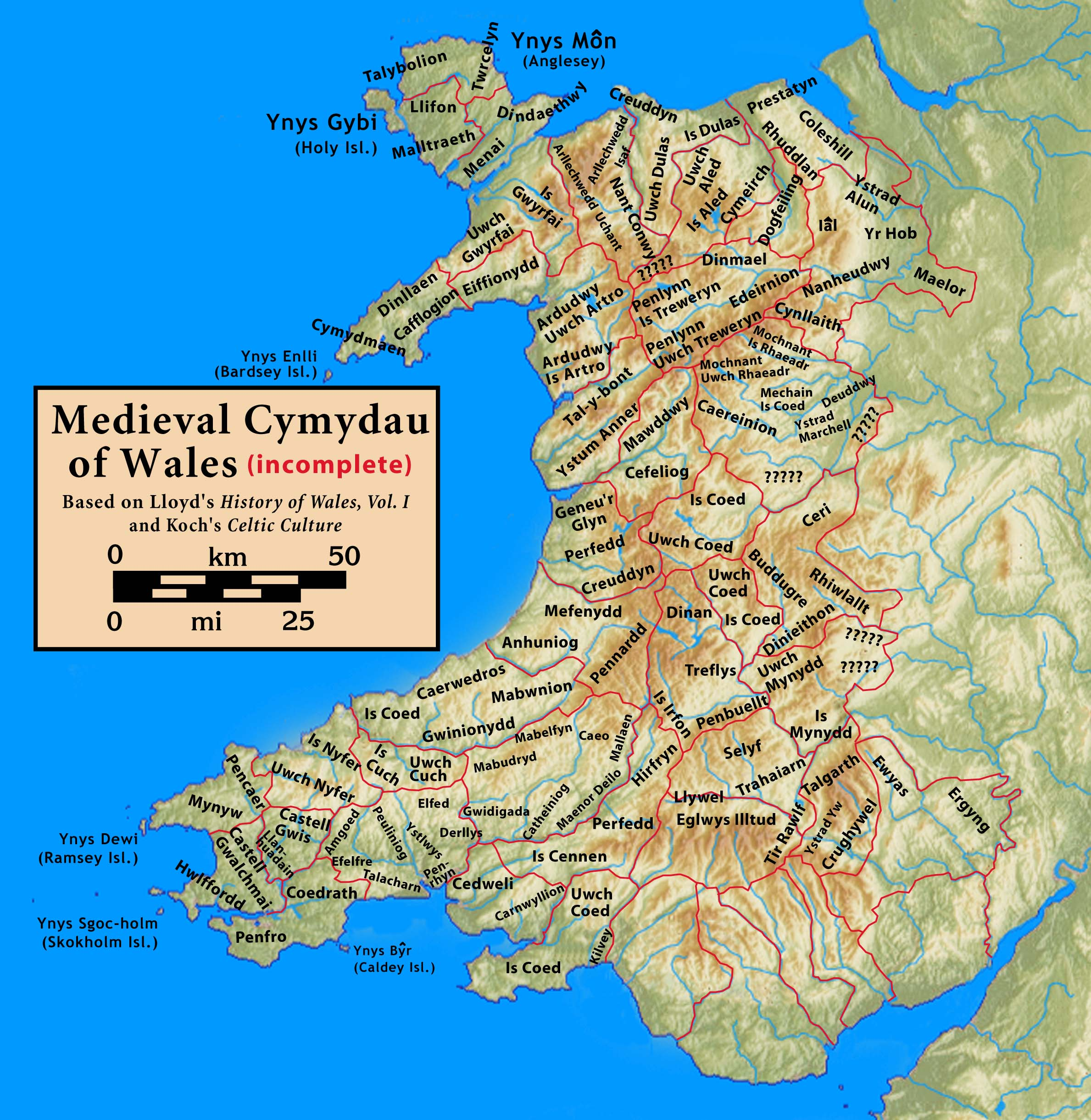
Medieval commotes of Wales (Llannerch Hudol and Y Gorddwr shown as question marks to the south and east respectively of Ystrad Marchell)

Llanerchydol is named after and is near the northern border of Llannerch Hudol (also written Llannerchwdwl, Llannerchudol, Llanerchudol or Llanerchydol), which was a medieval commote (cwmwd) in the cantref of Ystlyg in the Kingdom of Powys. It was in the south-east of the kingdom (north Powys today), close to the border with England. It was a small commote bordering Y Gorddwr on the east beyond the River Severn, Ystrad Marchell in the north, Caereinion on the west and Cedewain south of the River Rhiw at Berriew.

From the 11th century it was involved in the conflicts between the Norman Marcher Lords and the princes of Powys. When the kingdom of Powys was divided, after the death in 1160 of Madog ap Maredudd, the last prince of the whole of Powys, Llannerch Hudol was given to his illegitimate son Caswallon together with the commote of Broniarth, it subsequently became part of the principality of Powys Wenwynwyn. Its main centre was possibly the Welshpool motte and bailey castle (Domen Castell) built by Cadwgan ap Bleddyn in 1111, but there are at least three other motte and baileys within the small commote including Powis Castle (Castell Coch) and Ladies Mount.

Together with Ystrad Marchell and Deuddwr it formed the Teirswydd ("three commotes") which were among the lands restored into the possession of Gruffydd ap Gwenwynwyn in return for his homage and fealty by Llywelyn ap Gruffudd at Ystumanner in 1263.

== Placename ==
Llannerch Hudol literally means "Magic Glade" or "Wizard's Glade". However, it is common for Welsh placenames to be based on the name of a saint (llan, meaning "church" or "parish", followed by the name or a mutation of it); so it could mean, for example, "Enchanted Parish of St [Unknown]".

== Governance ==
Llanerchydol gives its name to the electoral ward of Welshpool Llanerchyddol, which elects a county councillor to Powys County Council.

The Llanerchyddol ward also elects up to six town councillors to Welshpool Town Council.
