= Ystrad Marchell =

Welsh medieval commote

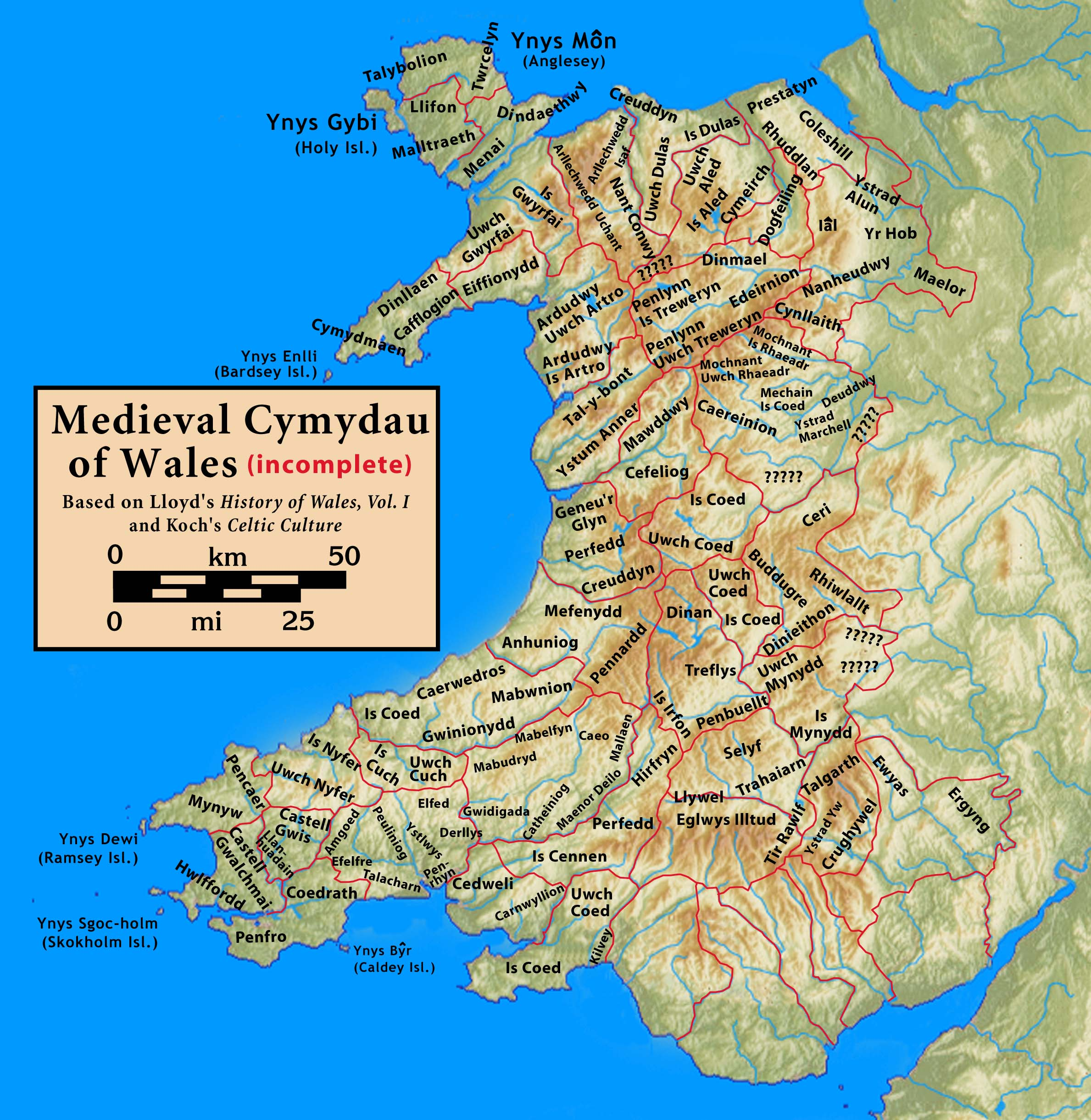
Medieval commotes of Wales

Ystrad Marchell (Welsh for 'Vale of Marchell'; sometimes Strad Marchell) was a medieval commote (cwmwd) in the cantref of Ystlyg in the Kingdom of Powys. It roughly coincides with the parish of Welshpool.

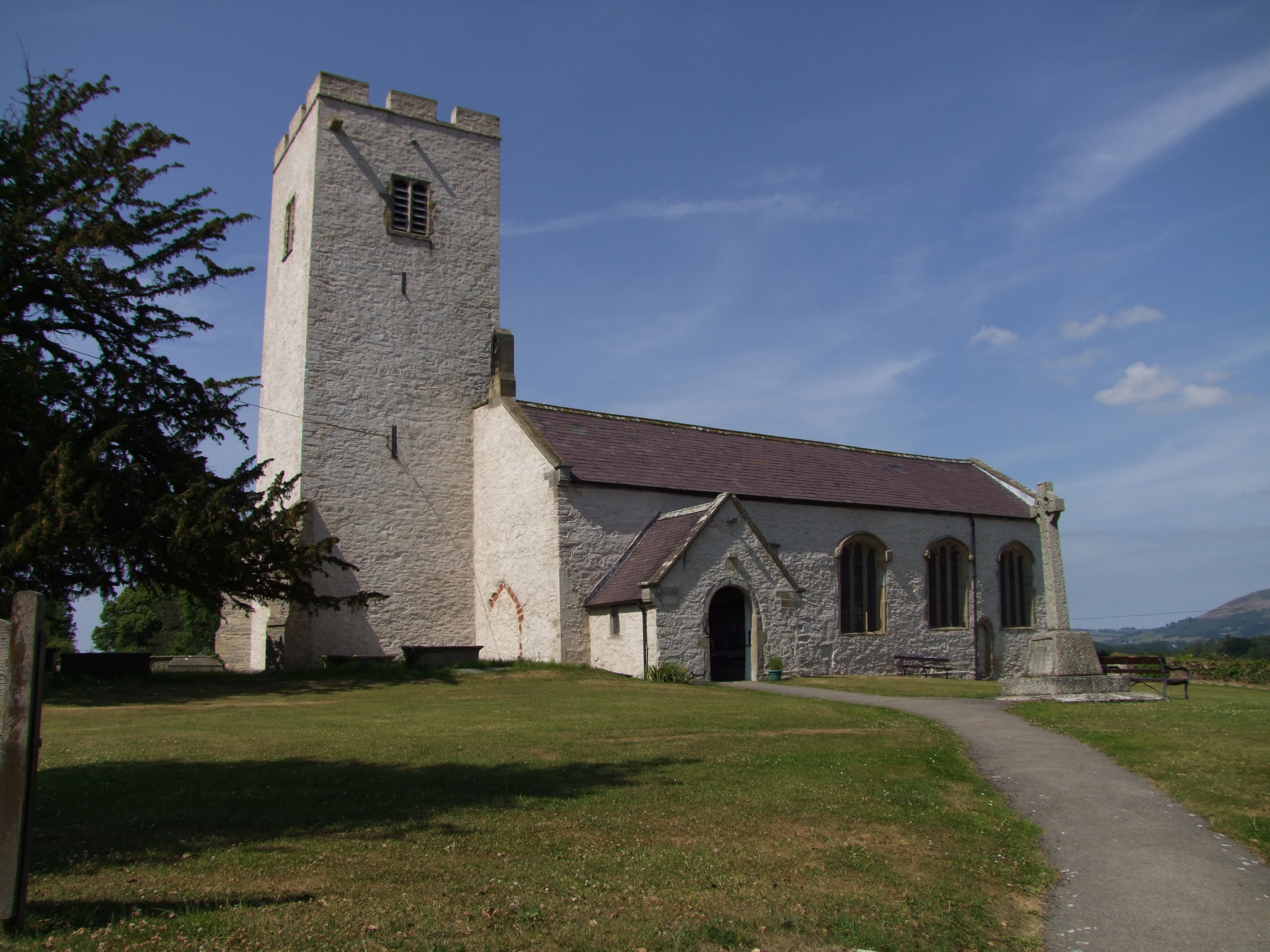
St Marcella's Church, Eglwys Wen, Denbigh

It lay at the east of the kingdom, bordering the cantref of Caereinion to the west and south, and the cantref of Mechain to the north-west. Within Ystlyg the other commotes were Deuddwr to the north, Llannerch Hudol to the south and Y Gorddwr (or Corddwr) to the east. The cantref of Ystlyg (excluding Y Gorddwr) corresponds to the later hundred of Deuddwr.

Ystrad Marchell was founded by or named for Marchell, a sister of the fifth or sixth century saint Tyfrydog. She was also a saint and is associated with Capel Marchell near Llanrwst, and Ffynnon Farchell (English: Well of St Marcella) and St Marcella's Church, in Eglwys Wen near Denbigh.

The valley of Ystrad Marchell is the site of the medieval Cistercian monastery of Strata Marcella (Latinised form of Ystrad Marchell, strata meaning paved road or causeway) which was founded in 1170-72 by Owain Cyfeiliog, who ruled the southern part (which would later be known as Powys Wenwynwyn) of the divided Kingdom of Powys, after the death in 1160 of Madog ap Maredudd, the last prince of the whole of Powys.

Together with Llannerch Hudol and Deuddwr it formed the Teirswydd ("three commotes") which were among the lands restored into the possession of Gruffydd ap Gwenwynwyn in return for his homage and fealty by Llywelyn ap Gruffudd at Ystumanner in 1263.
