= Owain Cyfeiliog =

Welsh prince and poet (died 1197)

- Lord of Cyfeiliog
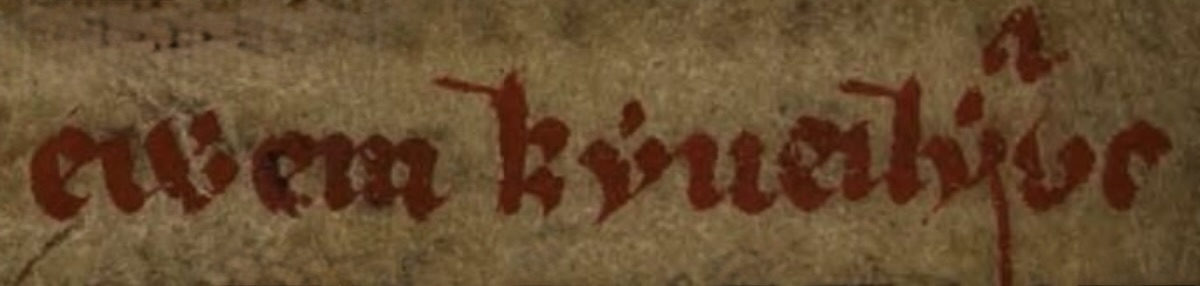
- The name eweın kẏueilẏ^{a}ỽc, from the rubric of 'Mawl Owain Cyfeiliog' by Cynddelw Brydydd Mawr found in NLW MS 6680B, f. 64^{v}
- Successor: Gwenwynwyn ab Owain Cyfeiliog
- Died: 1197; Strata Marcella, Ystlyg, Powys
- Buried: Strata Marcella
- Noble family: Lleision
- Spouses: Gwenllian ferch Owain Gwynedd; Gwenllian ferch Ednywain
- Issue: Gwenwynwyn; Gwerful; Gwenllian; Annes; Constance; Dyddgu; Moeleri; Meddefus; Hywel Goch; Eliwys; Cadwallon
- Father: Gruffudd ap Maredudd
- Mother: Gwerful ferch Gwrgeneu

Owain ap Gruffudd (Welsh pronunciation: [ˈoʊain ap 'grɨfɨð]) or Owain Cyfeiliog (Welsh pronunciation: [ˈoʊain kəˈvɛiljɔɡ]) was a Welsh nobleman and poet who ruled over one of the successor lordships of the kingdom of Powys after the death of Madog ap Maredudd, last king of Powys, in 1160. He was called Owain Cyfeiliog to distinguish him from the other Owain ap Gruffudd of his generation, that is, Owain Gwynedd.

Owain was the son of Gruffudd ap Maredudd (and thus grandson of Maredudd ap Bleddyn) and nephew of Madog ap Maredudd. Madog gave his nephew the cantref of Cyfeiliog to rule in 1147. On Madog's death in 1160 Owain became the ruler of most of southern Powys (this became known as Powys Wenwynwyn after it was inherited by his son). He married Gwenllian, one of the daughters of Owain Gwynedd.

He is recorded as having been in alliance with the other Welsh princes to withstand the invasion of 1165 by King Henry II of England. Thereafter he usually followed a policy of supporting the English crown. In 1170, he gave land for the founding of the abbey of Strata Marcella. In 1188, however, he refused to meet or support Baldwin, Archbishop of Canterbury and Giraldus Cambrensis when they journeyed around Wales to raise men for a crusade, and was excommunicated as a result.

In 1195, Owain handed the rule of most of his realm to his son Gwenwynwyn and retired to the abbey of Strata Marcella, where he died and was buried two years later. His illegitimate son, Cadwallon, was given the commotes of Llannerch Hudol and Broniarth.

Owain has also long been considered a notable poet. Although only one poem ascribed to him has been preserved—Hirlas Owain—it is commonly rated as one of the finest Welsh poems of this period. In the poem, Owain's bodyguard are gathered at his court following a raid in 1155 to free his brother Meurig from prison in Maelor. The mission accomplished, Owain calls for the drinking horn to be passed to each member of his bodyguard in turn, with words of praise for each one. There is a more sombre note when he remembers two of his men who fell in the fighting and grieves for their loss. The poem's most recent editor, Gruffydd Aled Williams, has suggested that the poem was actually written by Cynddelw Brydydd Mawr, the preeminent Welsh court poet of the century, perhaps in collaboration with Owain.

Owain also appears in the romance Fouke le Fitz Waryn as a knight who strikes Fulk with a spear.

Regnal titles
| Preceded by Madog ap Maredudd as Prince of Powys | Prince of Powys Wenwynwyn; 1160–1195 | Succeeded by Gwenwynwyn ab Owain |
