= Bettws Cedewain =

Village in Powys, Wales

Bettws Cedewain: Welsh: Betws Cedewain
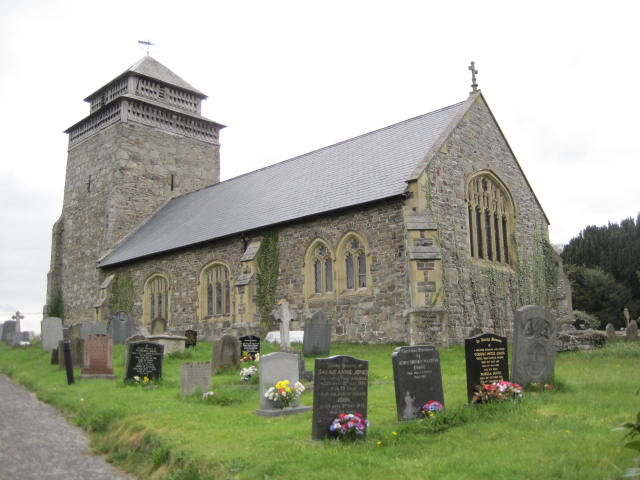
- St Beuno's Church

- Location within Powys
- Population: 445 (2011)
- OS grid reference: SO122967
- Community: Betws Cedewain
- Principal area: Powys
- Preserved county: Powys
- Country: Wales
- Sovereign state: United Kingdom
- Post town: NEWTOWN
- Postcode district: SY16
- Post town: WELSHPOOL
- Postcode district: SY21
- Dialling code: 01686
- Police: Dyfed-Powys
- Fire: Mid and West Wales
- Ambulance: Welsh
- UK Parliament: Montgomeryshire and Glyndŵr
- Senedd Cymru – Welsh Parliament: Montgomeryshire
- List of places UK Wales Powys 52.561°N 03.295°W Community map: Map of the community

Bettws Cedewain (Welsh: Betws Cedewain), also known as Bettws Cedewen, is a small village and community in Montgomeryshire, Powys, Wales. It lies in a sheltered valley on the banks of the River Bechan, 3 miles (5 km) north of Newtown, on the B4389 road. The community is known as Betws Cedewain, and includes the hamlets of Highgate and Brooks.

A wooden motte-and-bailey castle appears to have existed there at one time. The site was also possibly previously used by Roman soldiers, and an ancient church was founded there by Saint Beuno in the 6th century.

Bettws Cedewain's Grade II* listed St Beuno's church, which was the location of the village's first schoolroom, contains possibly the only pre-Reformation memorial brass in the county, dedicated to the Reverend John ap Meredyth for his work in planning and building the tower.

Until 1914, most properties in the village belonged to the Gregynog estate.

Bettws Hall is a local venue for game bird shoots.

The first element in the name of the village is from the Middle English word bedhus, meaning "prayer house", which became betws in Welsh. Cedewain is the name of the medieval land division, or cantref, in which the village is situated.

National Cycle Route 81 (Lôn Cambria) passes through the village.

== See also ==
- St Beuno's Church, Bettws Cedewain
