= Cyfeiliog =

Welsh medieval commote

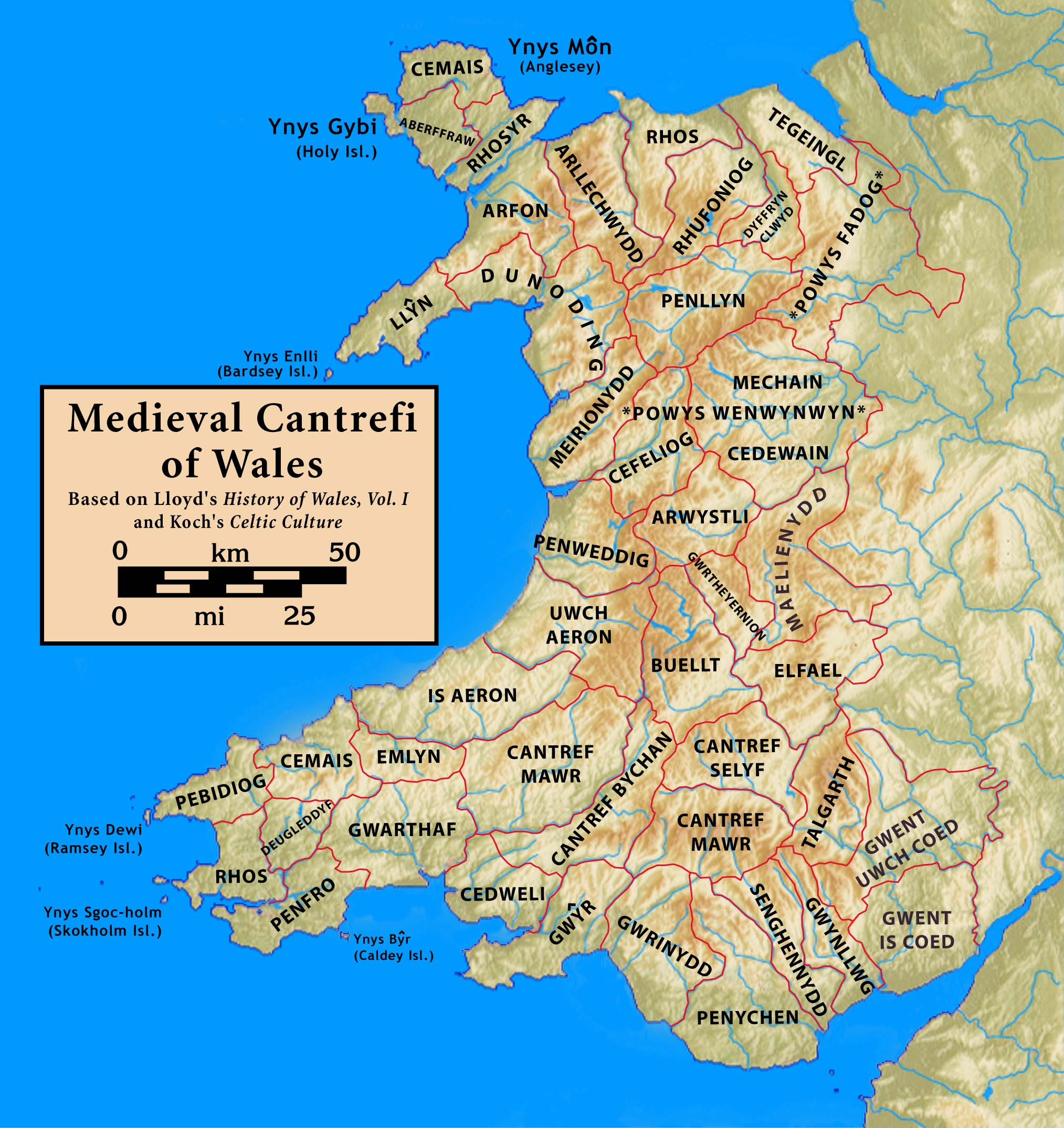
Cantrefi of Medieval Wales

Medieval kingdoms of Wales

Cyfeiliog (Welsh pronunciation: [kəˈvɛiljɔɡ]) was a medieval commote in the cantref of Cynan of the Kingdom of Powys. Cynan also contained the commote of Mawddwy. Other sources refer to Cyfeiliog as a cantref in its own right, possibly as a result of Cynan being renamed for the largest commote within it. The largest modern town in the old Cyfeiliog area is Machynlleth.

It bordered the cantrefi of Penllyn in the north, Caereinion in the east and Arwystli in the south-east. Its border in the north-east was with the cantref of Meirionydd in the Kingdom of Gwynedd, and its south-east border was with the cantref of Penweddig in the Kingdom of Ceredigion.

After the death of Madog ap Maredudd – the last prince of the whole of Powys – and his eldest son and heir in 1160, the kingdom was divided up between his surviving sons Gruffydd Maelor, Owain Fychan and Owain Brogyntyn, his nephew Owain Cyfeiliog and his half-brother Iorwerth Goch. Cyfeiliog was inherited by Owain Cyfeiliog. He joined the Welsh alliance under Owain Gwynedd to resist the invasion of Henry II in 1165, but he changed his allegiance later and gradually gained control over a much larger area in the south of Powys, in particular by acquiring the territories of Iorwerth Goch and Owain Fychan. He passed his territories to his son Gwenwynwyn in 1195 and they became known as Powys Wenwynwyn.
