= Cedewain =

Welsh medieval cantref

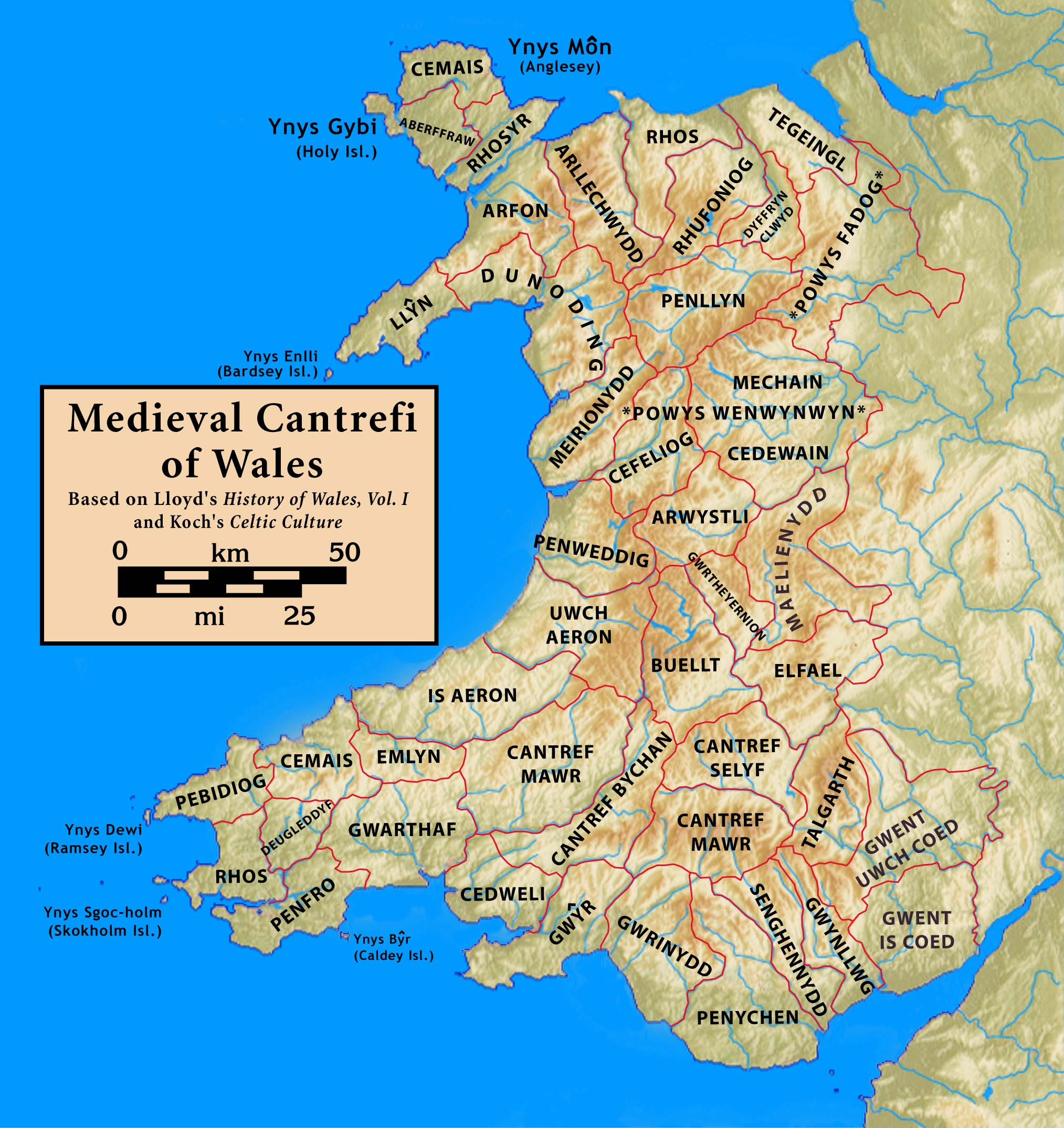
Cantrefi of Medieval Wales

Cedewain (or Cydewain) was a medieval cantref in the Kingdom of Powys. It possibly consisted of the commotes (cymydau) of Cynan, Hafren and Uwch Hanes. Other sources give the commotes as Cedewain, Eginlle and Ceri.

It lay at the south of the kingdom, bordering with the cantrefi of Caereinion and Ystlyg to the north across the river Rhiw, and the cantrefi of Arwystli (subject to disputes between Powys and Gwynedd) and Maelienydd (originally an independent kingdom) to the south. Its easterly border, which was the River Severn, faced England.

Bettws Cedewain takes its name from the cantref. The lords of Cedewain resided at Dolforwyn Castle. Maredudd ap Rhobert was Lord of Cedewain and Chief Counsellor of Wales when he died in 1244 after joining the religious order at Strata Florida Abbey.

Knighton was attacked by 'the lords of Ceri and Cydewain' in 1260, but the following year saw the death of Owain ap Maredudd, Lord of Cydewain, nephew of Maredudd ap Rhobert. In early 1278, his daughter Angharad claimed Cydewain in litigation as Owain's heir, stating that Owain's enemy, Llywelyn ap Gruffudd, had taken possession of it immediately after her father's death.

In 1330-1331 Maredudd ap Madog and Owain ap Madog petitioned King Edward III for a judgement on the ownership of Cedewain, which was then under the king's control. They claimed to be the rightful heirs to the cantref and that it was seized from their ancestors by the Marcher Lord family of the Mortimers. They said that Roger Mortimer had allowed them to keep some land between the River Severn and Ceri (the northern commote of Maelienydd), but Edmund had seized that too.
