= Deuddwr =

Welsh medieval commote

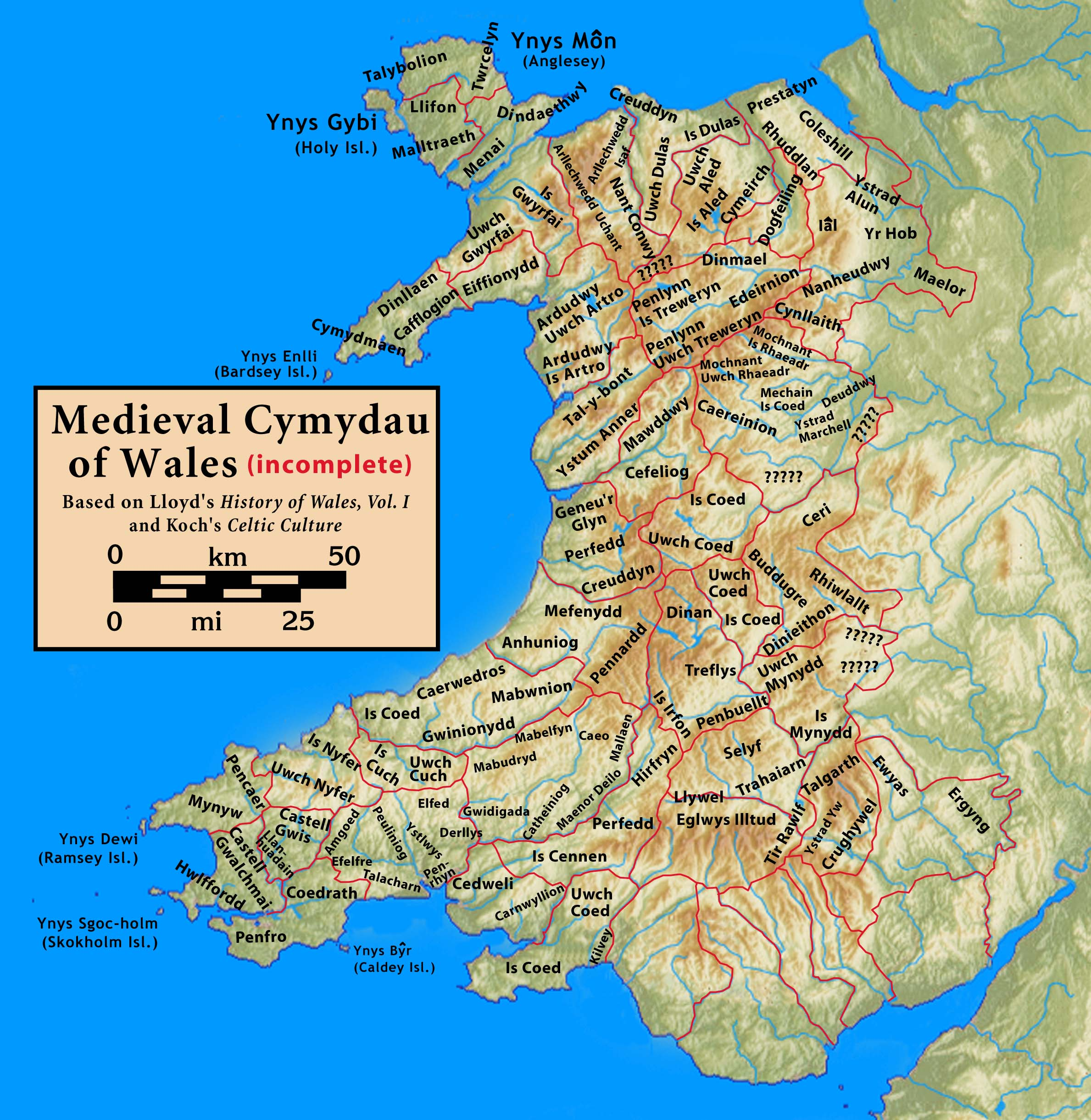
Medieval commotes of Wales

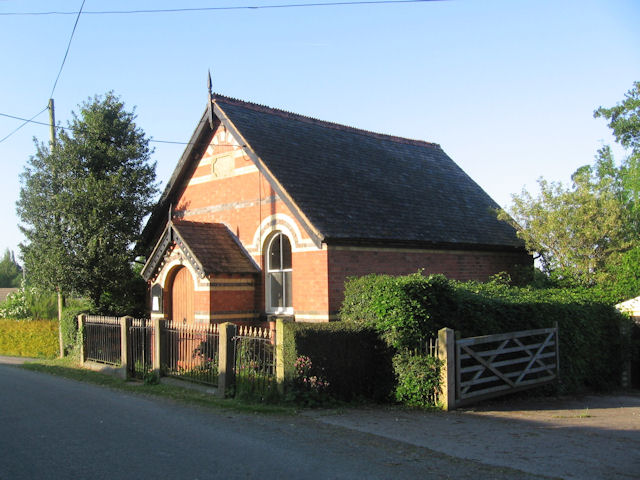
Chapel at Deuddwr

Deuddwr (Welsh for 'confluence'; lit. 'two waters'; Welsh pronunciation) was a medieval commote (cwmwd) in the cantref of Ystlyg in the Kingdom of Powys.

It lay at the east of the kingdom, bordering England to the north, the cantref of Mechain to the north-west and, within Ystlyg, the commotes of Ystrad Marchell to the south and Y Gorddwr to the east. It is also between the River Vyrnwy in the north-east and the River Severn in the south-east, they meet at the east of the commote, hence its name. The cantref of Ystlyg (excluding Y Gorddwr) corresponds to the later hundred of Deuddwr. The name of this hundred has been corrupted to Deythur or Deytheur. The name occurs in modern placenames, e.g. the parish of Llansantffraid Deythur and the village of Deuddwr south-east of Llansantffraid-ym-Mechain.

Together with Llannerch Hudol and Ystrad Marchell it formed the Teirswydd ("three commotes") which were among the lands restored into the possession of Gruffydd ap Gwenwynwyn in return for his homage and fealty by Llywelyn ap Gruffudd at Ystumanner in 1263.
