= Caerwedros (commote) =

Welsh medieval commote

Caerwedros was a medieval commote (Welsh: cwmwd) in the south of the Kingdom of Ceredigion. With Mebwynion, Gwynionydd and Is Coed, Caerwedros was one of three cantref Is Aeron commotes.

Caerwedros was a coastal commote, which lay on the shores of Cardigan Bay. It boarded Anhuniog commote in the north (in the Uwch Aeron cantref), Mebwynion commote to the east, and Gwynionydd and Is Coed commotes to the south.

It's possible that the cwmwd's early centre was in Llwyndafydd. It was later occupied by the Normans for a period of time and Castell Caerwedros was built here, near Llwyndafydd, by Lord Richard de Clare in 1110.

== See also ==
- Cantref
- Kingdom of Ceredigion

== Bibliography ==
- Williams, Albert Hughes (1969), An Introduction to the History of Wales, University of Wales Press
- Davis, Paul (2000), A company of forts: a guide to the medieval castles of west Wales, Gomer, ISBN 9781859028391
