= Mechain =

Welsh medieval cantref

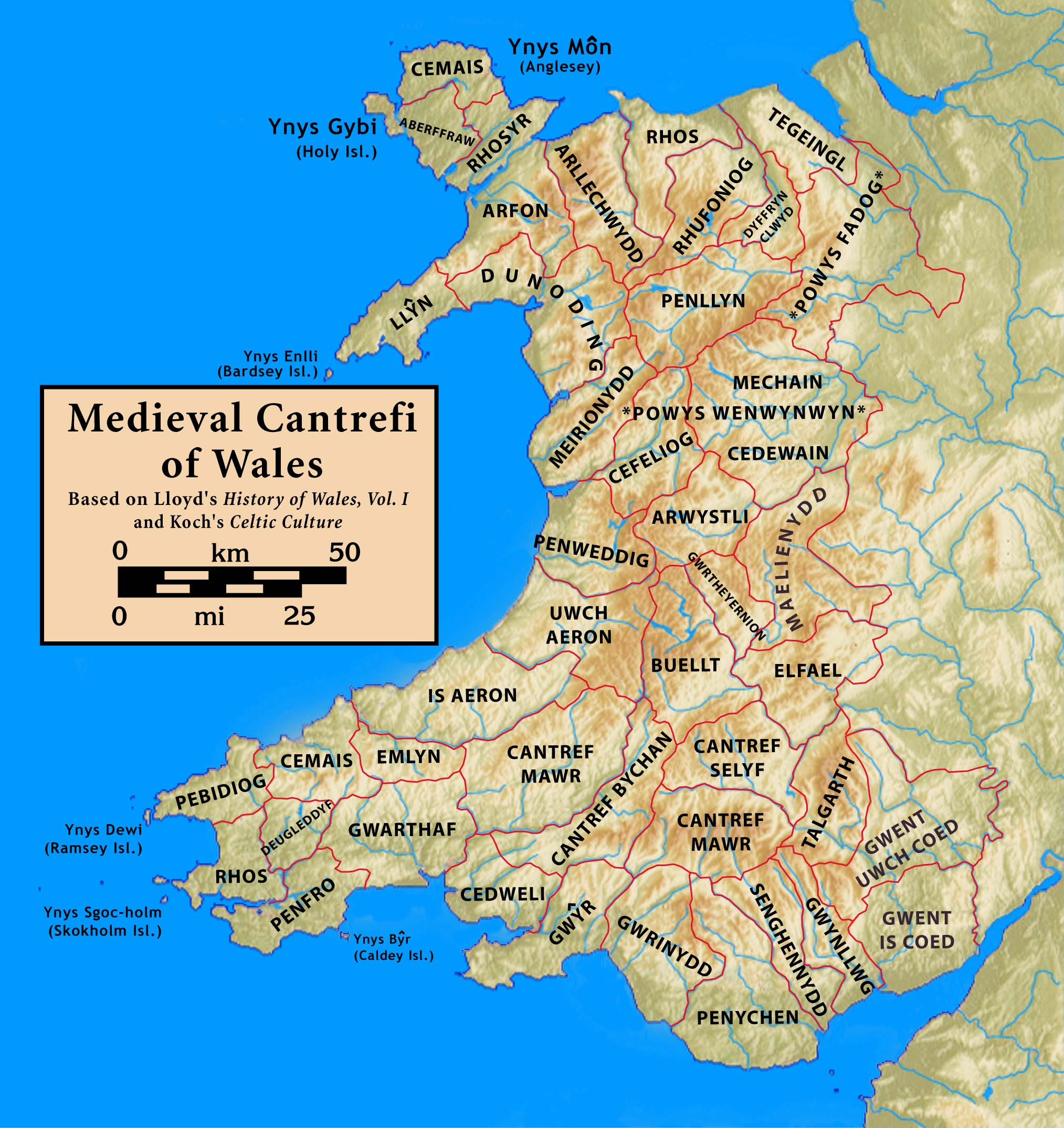
Cantrefi of Medieval Wales

Mechain was a medieval cantref in the Kingdom of Powys. This cantref has also been referred to as Y Fyrnwy (Vyrnwy). Mechain may owe its name to the River Cain which flows through it on its way to join the River Vyrnwy; 'Me' or 'Mach' (cf. Machynlleth, Mathrafal, etc., and in modern Welsh, field is maes) may signify meadows or plain, in which case Mechain would mean "Meadows of the Cain". It corresponds to the later hundred of Llanfyllin.

Mechain lay almost in the centre of the kingdom, bordering with the cantref of Caereinion to the south, the two commotes of the cantref of Mochnant to the north, and the commotes of Deuddwr and Ystrad Marchell in the cantref of Ystlyg to the east.

It consisted of the commotes (cymydau) of Mechain Uwch Coed (Mechain above the wood) and Mechain Is Coed (Mechain below the wood) separated by the large wood or forest which stretched across the cantref around Bwlch-y-cibau. The caput of Mechain Uwch Coed was at Tomen yr Allt (52.7806°N 3.2961°W) near Llanfyllin and that of Mechain Is Coed was at Tomen y Castell (52.7734°N 3.2077°W) near Llanfechain.

The inclusion of ym-Mechain in a placename means 'in Mechain', e.g. Llansantffraid-ym-Mechain and Llanarmon-ym-Mechain (an historic name for Llanfechain).

Gwerful Mechain, a female Welsh poet of the later Middle Ages renowned for her daring erotic verse, was a native of Mechain.
