= Caereinion =

Welsh medieval cantref

Coordinates: 52.69°N 3.29°W

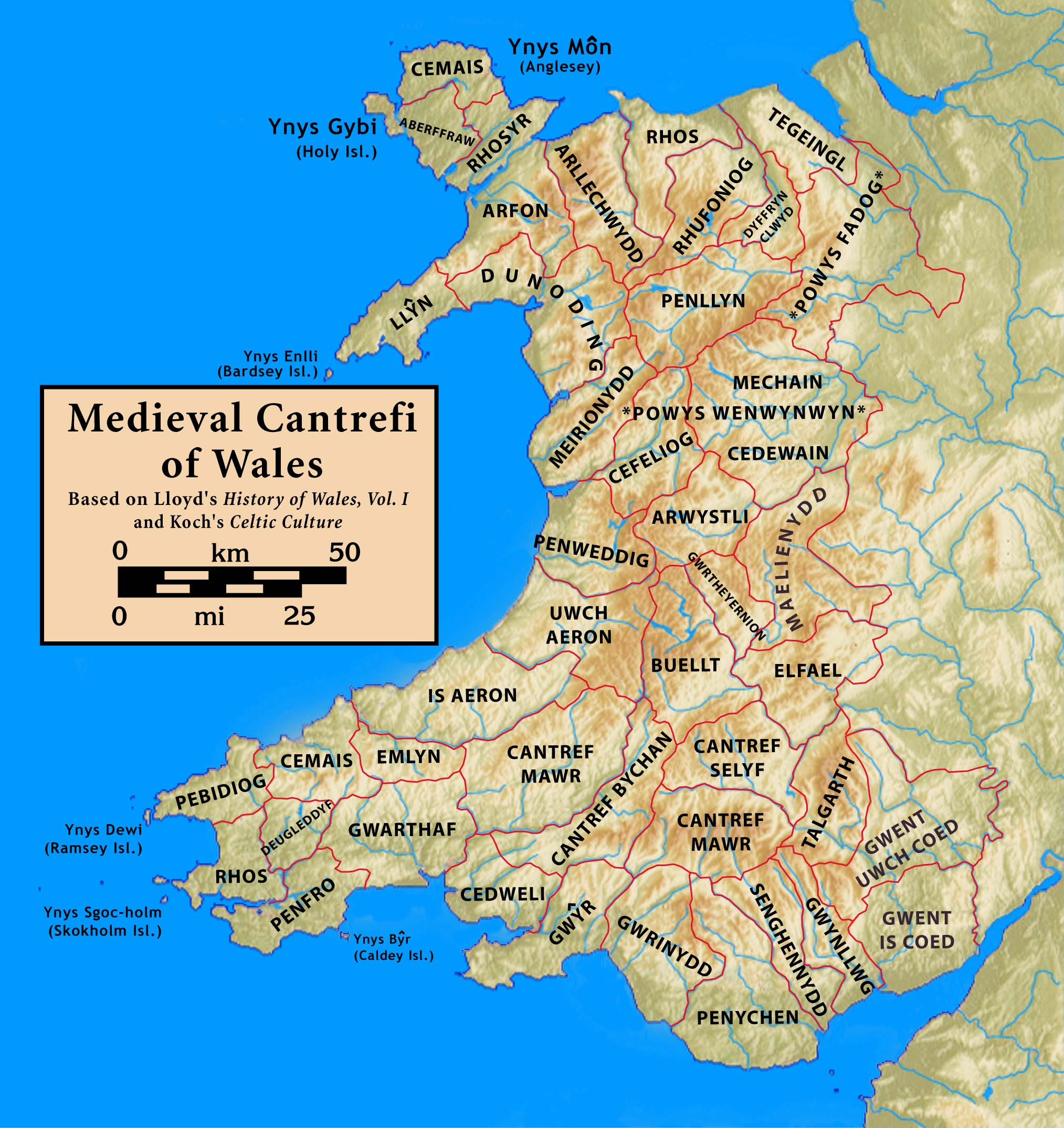
Cantrefi of Medieval Wales

Caereinion (fort of Einion) was a medieval cantref in the Kingdom of Powys, or possibly it was a commote (cwmwd) within a cantref called Llŷs Wynaf. It was divided into the manors of Uwch Coed and Is Coed.

It lay towards the south of the kingdom, bordering with the commote of Mochnant Uwch Rhaeadr of the cantref of Mochnant and the cantref of Mechain to the north, the commotes of Ystrad Marchell and Llanerch Hudol in the cantref of Ystlyg to the east, the cantrefi of Cedewain to the south and Cyfeiliog to the west.

It roughly corresponds to the later hundred of Mathrafal.

Castle Caereinion, Caereinion Fechan, Llanfair Caereinion, Llanerfyl, Llangadfan, Llangyniew and part of Berriew are within the territory of this cantref.
