= Y Gorddwr =

Welsh medieval commote

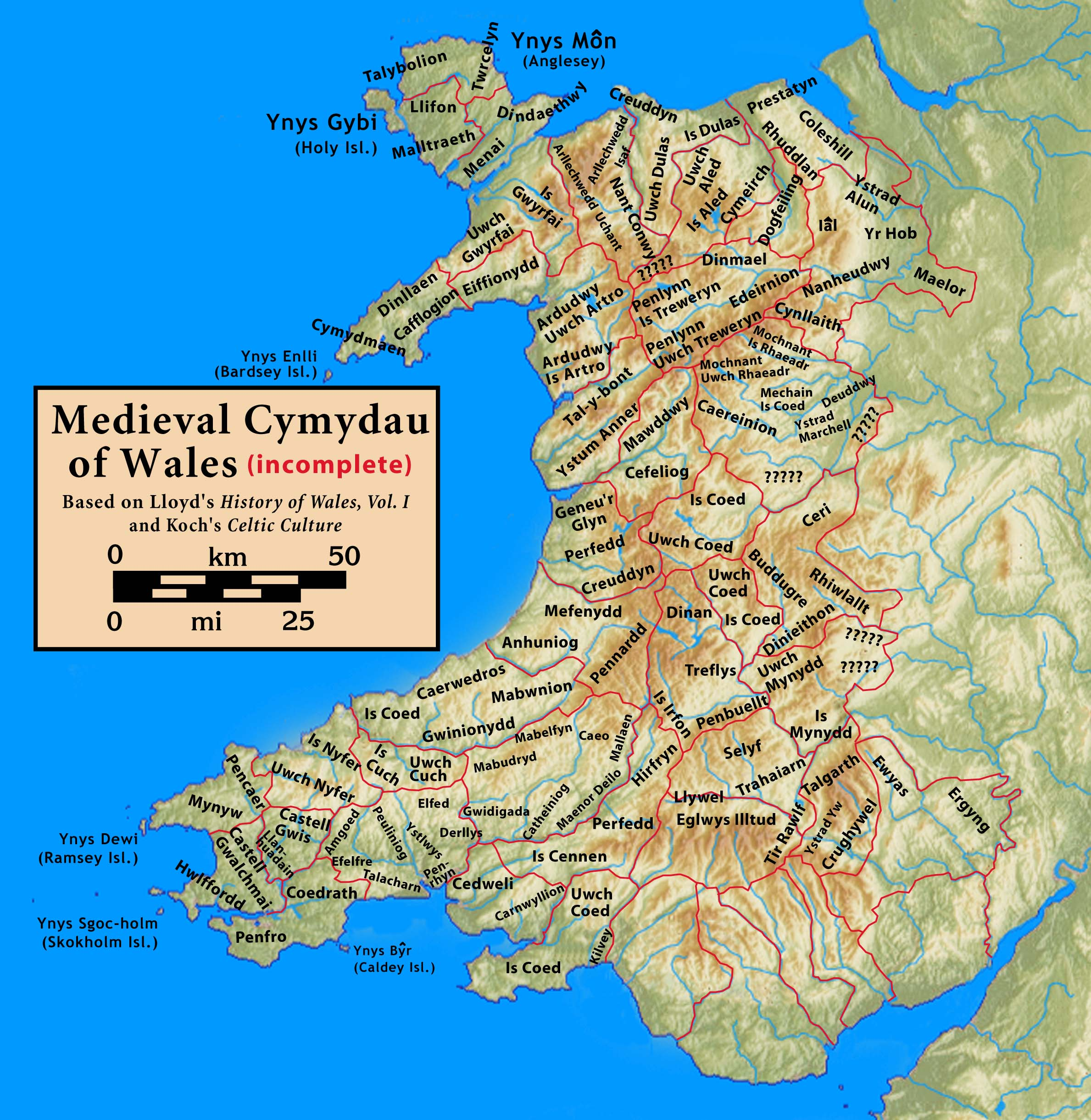
Medieval commotes of Wales (Llannerch Hudol and Y Gorddwr shown as question marks to the south and east respectively of Ystrad Marchell)

Y Gorddwr (Welsh for 'The Upper Water'; also known as Corddwr) was a medieval commote (cwmwd) in the cantref of Ystlyg in the Kingdom of Powys. It was on the eastern side of the River Severn bordering England, on the west it was bordered by two of the other commotes of Ystlyg - Deuddwr in the north and Ystrad Marchell in the south. Its Welsh name could mean "the upper water"; gor- "upper-", dŵr "water".

After the Norman Conquest, Y Gorddwr was claimed by Roger le Corbet, the Baron of Caus within the Marcher Lordship of Roger de Montgomery.

In 1241, Gruffydd ap Gwenwynwyn regained most of the lands lost by his father, Gwenwynwyn in about 1216. Gruffydd immediately claimed the territory of Y Gorddwr by ancient inheritance, bringing him into conflict with the Corbet family. He was related to them through his mother, Margaret, who was a sister of Thomas Corbet, the baron of Caus at the time, this added weight to his claim. He inherited his mother's lands in Y Gorddwr in 1246, and appropriated more in 1252 while King Henry III was in dispute with Simon de Montfort. Thomas Corbet brought a legal action against Gruffydd in 1255, the English lords who heard the case found against Gruffydd.

In 1257, before Gruffydd could relinquish the land in Y Gorddwr, Llywelyn ap Gruffudd had taken his territory in Powys and forced him into exile in England. King Henry still insisted that he handed the territory he held in Y Gorddwr over to Corbet, so in 1263 Gruffydd transferred his allegiance to Llywelyn, and his lands were returned to him. He fought as an ally of Llywelyn and Simon de Montfort against the king until the defeat and death of Simon at the Battle of Evesham in 1265. In the Treaty of Montgomery in 1267, Llywelyn and Gruffydd agreed to end hostilities with the king.

Henry III died in 1272 and Llywelyn renewed hostilities against England, but Gruffydd now took sides against Llywelyn and lost his territories again. In 1274, with his son, Owain and Dafydd ap Gruffudd he was part of an unsuccessful plot to assassinate Llwelyn. He was forced to flee to Shrewsbury from where he led raids against Llywelyn and supported the campaign of Edward I to disinherit Llywelyn. In 1277, Llywelyn was forced to accept terms. Gruffydd was rewarded for supporting Edward and he received back his lands in Powys. He continued, however, to make claims against Peter Corbet for Y Gorddwr, and after his death his family continued to dispute tithes there.
