= Creuddyn, Ceredigion =

Welsh medieval commote

Coordinates: 52°22′19″N 3°57′44″W

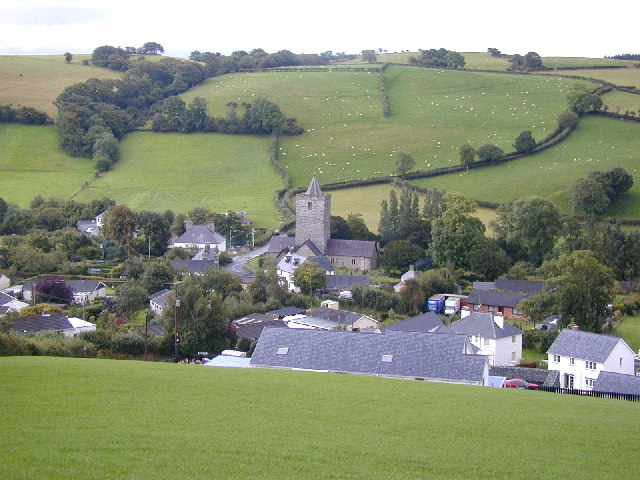
Llanfihangel-y-Creuddyn viewed from the north.

Creuddyn was a medieval commote (cwmwd) and, later, a lordship in Ceredigion, Wales. It was located between the rivers Ystwyth and Rheidol, and was one of the three commotes of Cantref Penweddig. The name, of Old Welsh origin, probably refers to the Pen Dinas hill fort, anciently known as Dinas Maelor. The natural centre of the commote was Llanfihangel y Creuddyn where five roads meet at the village. The name survives in the name of a rural community and church of the same name; however the modern community is much smaller than the medieval commote.

== History ==
Several princes of Deheubarth ruled in medieval Kingdom of Ceredigion, including Creuddyn. Rhys ap Gruffydd's grandson Maelgwn Fychan (died 1257) battled for control of the area; Gwenllian (died 1254) died at Llanfihangel-y-Creuddyn. Either Maelgwn or his grandsons Llywelyn or Rhys may have been responsible for building the large 13th-century church which still stands today.
