= Neuadd Maldwyn =

County Building in Welshpool, Wales

County Offices
- Neuadd Maldwyn (Welsh)
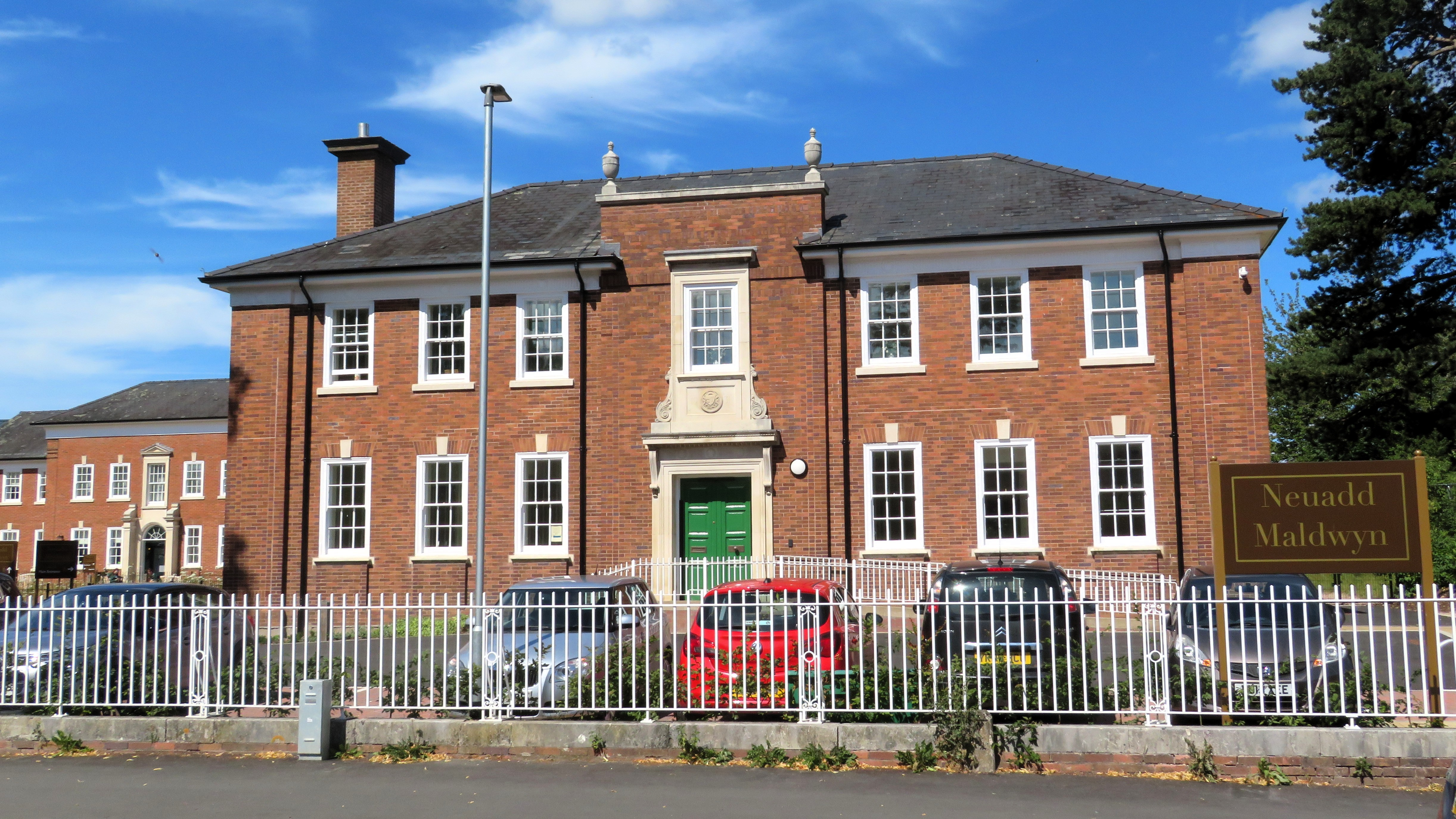
- Neuadd Maldwyn, photographed in 2025

- Shown in Powys
- 52.6580°N 3.1424°W
- Location: Severn Road, Welshpool

History
- Built: 1931

Site notes
- Architect(s): Frank Gatley Briggs and Arnold Thornely
- Architectural style: Neo-Georgian style

Listed Building – Grade II
- Official name: Powys County Council Offices
- Designated: 17 October 2008
- Reference no.: 87576

Neaudd Maldwyn, formerly the Montgomeryshire County Offices, is a former municipal building in Severn Street, Welshpool, Powys, Wales. The structure, which was the headquarters of Montgomeryshire County Council, is a Grade II listed building. It now serves as an independent living scheme for older people.

== History ==
Following the implementation of the Local Government Act 1888, which established county councils in every county, Montgomeryshire County Council initially held its meetings in Montgomery, which was the traditional county town and the venue for the assizes. By the 1920s, with the increasing responsibilities of council councils, council leaders decided to establish dedicated offices: the site they selected was open land on the north side of Severn Road.

The new building was designed by Frank Gatley Briggs and Sir Arnold Thornely in the Neo-Georgian style, built in red brick with stone dressings and was completed in 1931. The original design involved a symmetrical main frontage with seven bays facing onto Severn Road. The central bay featured a doorway with a stone architrave flanked by brackets supporting a canopy; there was a stone panel and a sash window on the first floor and a parapet with two urns above. The other bays were fenestrated with sash windows. The building was considerably extended to the rear in the late 1930s and then again in 1959. Internally, the principal room was the council chamber at the rear of the building.

Following local government re-organisation in 1974, the building became the offices of Montgomeryshire District Council. However, following the creation of unitary authorities in 1996, it was relegated to the role of regional office for Powys County Council, the headquarters of which was based in Llandrindod Wells.

In December 2018, Powys County Council decided that the building had become too expensive to maintain and that it was surplus to requirements, and, in May 2019, the council decided to sell it to Clwyd Alyn Housing Association for conversion into flats for older people. Following a local consultation, during which some residents expressed concern that the project only catered for a single age group, the housing association secured planning consent for the creation of a 65-room residential care facility on the site in spring 2021. Contractors started on site with a programme of works to restore, convert and extend the building in summer 2021. The new facility opened in 2025.
