= Rhosyr (cantref) =

Welsh medieval cantref

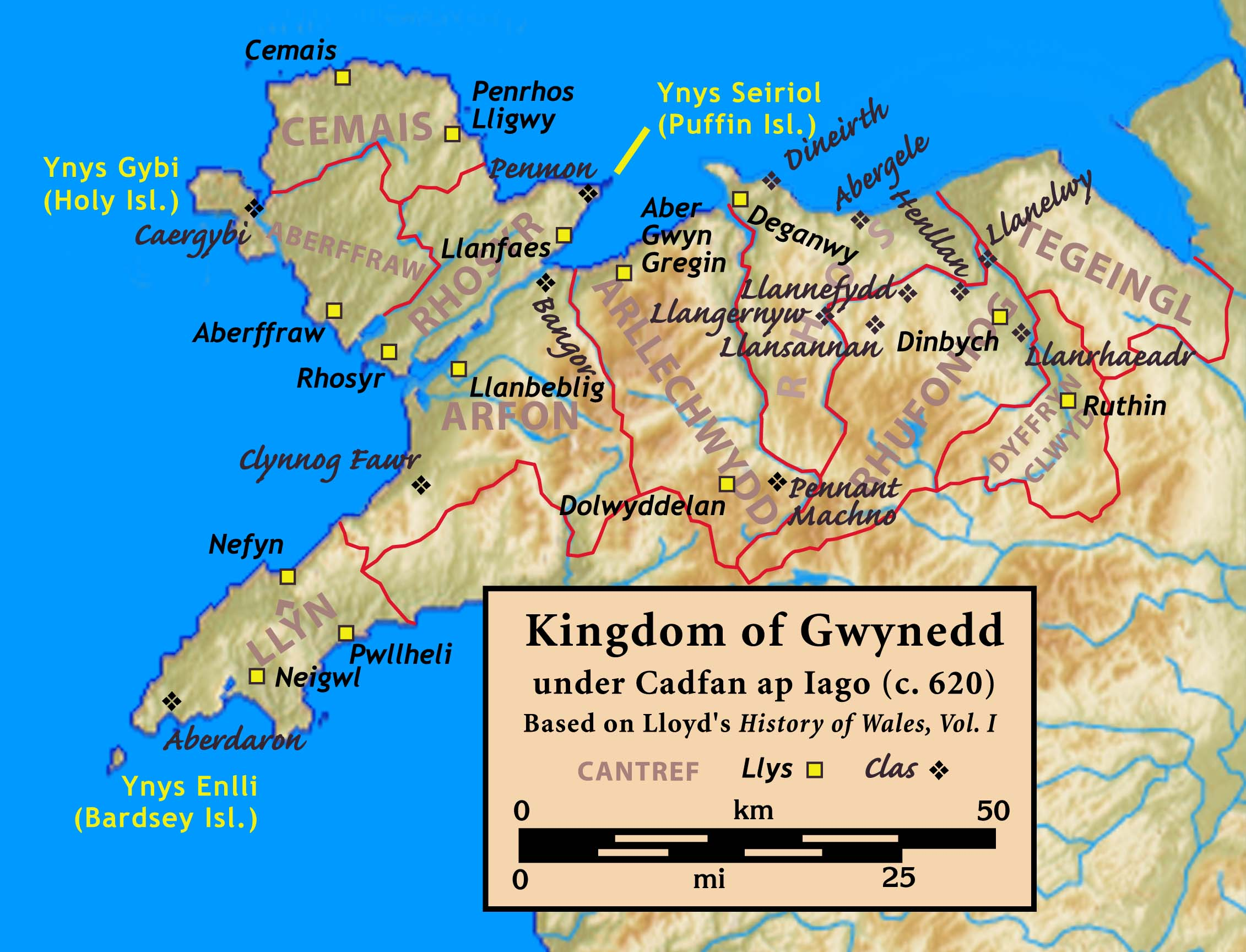
Kingdom of Gwynedd c.620, showing cantrefi

Rhosyr was the name of one of the three medieval cantrefs (meaning a hundred towns) on the island of Anglesey, north Wales, in the Kingdom of Gwynedd. It lay on the southern side of the island facing the Menai Strait which separates Anglesey from the mainland.

There are indications that Rhosyr existed as far back as the 6th century and the period of St Caffo and King Maelgwn Gwynedd. The cantref stretched inland from the Menai Strait to the tidal Maltraeth Estuary controlling the dry land route through Anglesey, hence held a strategic position. The township of Rhosyr, in the south of the cantref, was of military importance for controlling access to the Menai Strait.

== See also ==
- Aberffraw cantref
- Cemais (Anglesey cantref)

== Sources ==
- Aris, Mary (2019), Rhosyr: Its History and Topography in the Age of the Welsh Princes, Matador, ISBN 978-1789016-673
