= Penweddig =

Welsh medieval cantref

Penweddig was a medieval cantref – a Welsh land division – of the kingdom of Ceredigion and later of the kingdom of Deheubarth) which is now in the county of Ceredigion, Wales. The community secondary school Ysgol Gyfun Gymunedol Penweddig is named after the cantref.

== Commotes ==
Penweddig comprised three commotes (cwmwd; plural cymydau):

- Genau'r Glyn
- Y Creuddyn
- Perfedd
