= Maredudd ap Rhobert =

Maredudd ap Rhobert (died 1244) was a minor Welsh ruler of Cedewain in the thirteenth century. A descendant of Trahaearn ap Caradog, he allied with king John of England against the prince of Gwynedd Llywelyn ab Iorwerth during the king's campaign of 1211, but by 1215 he had submitted to the prince. After Llywelyn's death, he opposed the princeship of Dafydd ap Llywelyn in 1241 in favour of Llywelyn's other, illegitimate son, Gruffydd ap Llywelyn. He married Juliana de Lacy; her ancestry is uncertain, but she may have been a daughter of Walter de Lacy. He died at Strata Florida Abbey in 1244.
