= Ynysymaengwyn =

Coordinates: 52°36′02″N 04°04′12″W

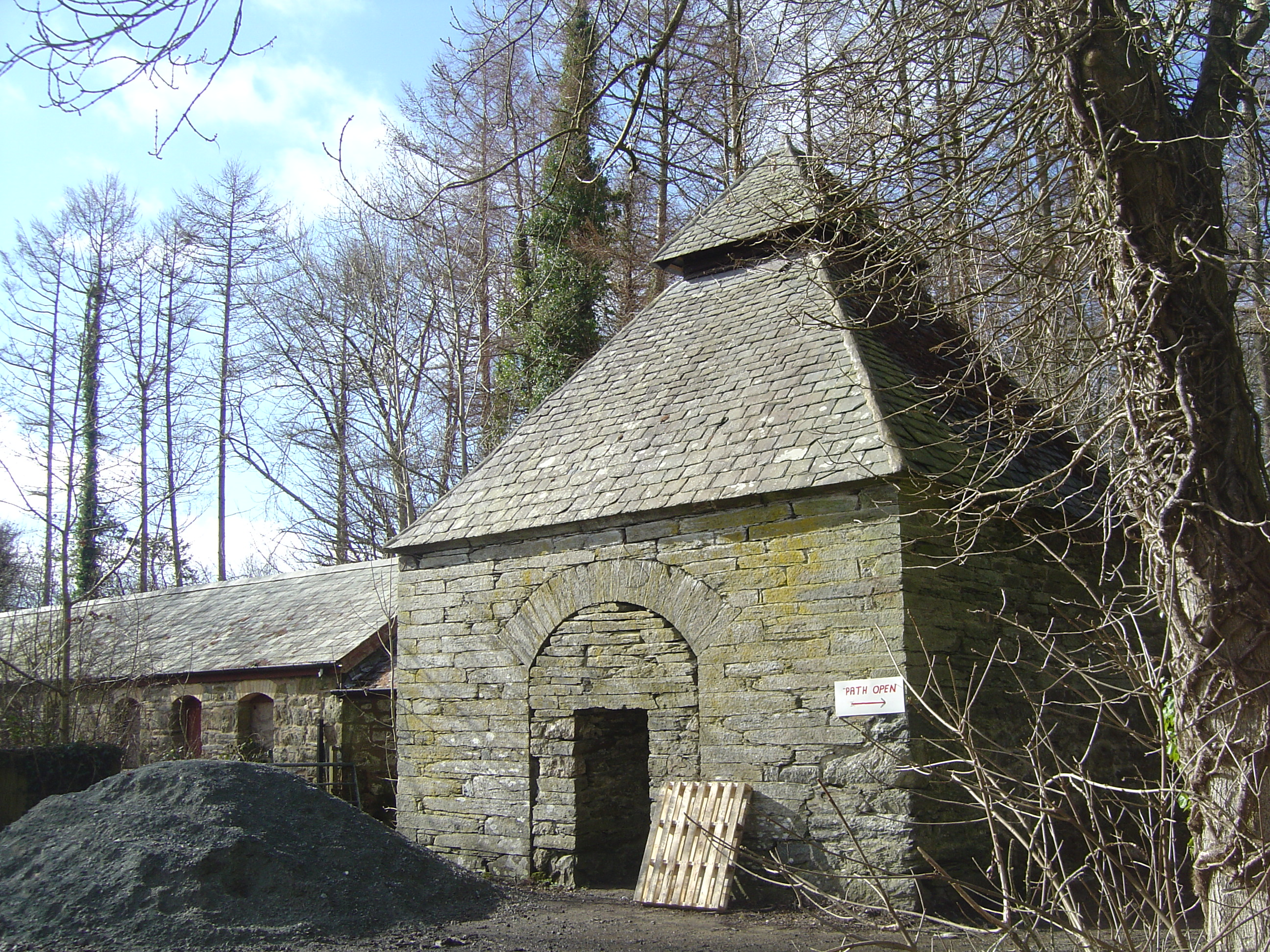
The dovecote, one of the remaining buildings at Ynysymaengwyn

Ynysymaengwyn was a gentry house in the parish of Tywyn, Gwynedd (formerly Merioneth), situated near the left bank of the River Dysynni. The name means 'the white stone island'.

== Early history ==
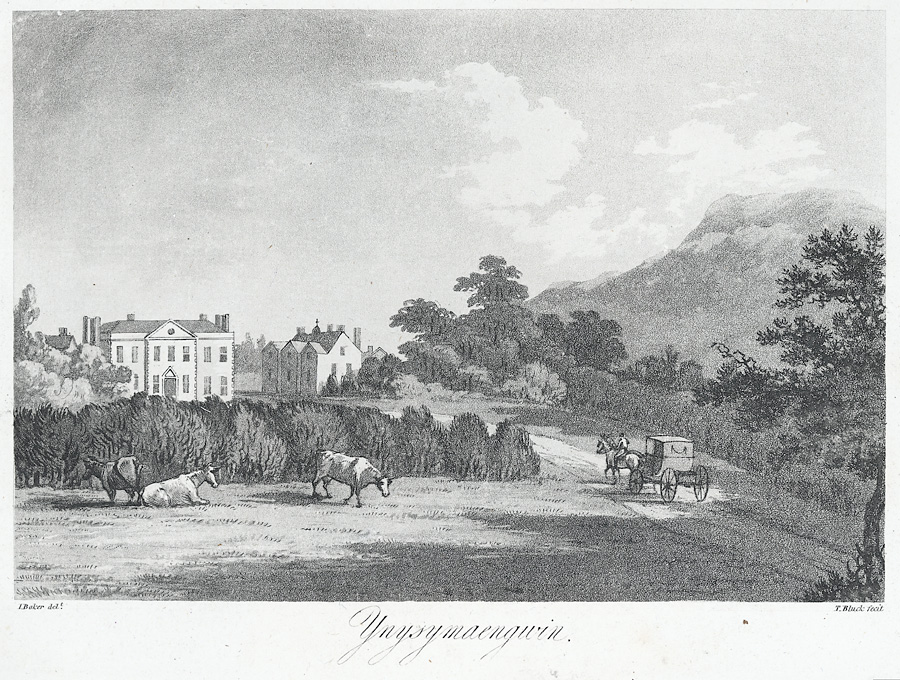
Ynysymaengwyn mansion and part of estate. Cows and horse-drawn carriage in foreground

It was in the commote of Ystumanner or Ystum Anner that Gruffudd ap Gwenwynwyn did homage and swore fealty to Llywelyn ap Gruffudd on 12 December 1263. In return he was made a vassal lord and the lands taken from him about six years earlier were restored to him. The commote was in the cantref of Meirionnydd.

From the late medieval period until the 20th century, Ynysymaengwyn, situated roughly 1 mile (1.6 km) from Tywyn by the road to Bryn-crug, was by far the most powerful estate in the parish. The family's wealth is revealed in official records and also in the Welsh poetry composed to its leading members.

The estate may be traced back to the days of Gruffudd ab Adda of Dôl-goch and Ynysymaengwyn, bailiff of the commote of Ystumanner in 1330 and 1334, whose effigy is thought to lie in St Cadfan's church in Tywyn. His daughter Nest married Llywelyn ap Cynwrig ab Osborn Wyddel, and Ynysymaengwyn was to remain in the hands of their direct male descendants for well over two centuries. Llywelyn's great-great-grandson Siencyn (or Jenkin) ab Iorwerth ab Einion ap Gruffudd ap Llywelyn farmed Crown lands in Cyfyng and Caethle as well as the Aberdyfi ferry in the middle of the 15th century.

Siencyn's son Hywel married Mary the daughter of Sir Roger Kynaston (c.1433 - 1495). Hywel died of the plague in 1494, an event which inspired a memorable elegy by Hywel Rheinallt. He was followed by his son Hwmffre (or Humphrey) who was the subject of a famous request by the poet Tudur Aled to bring to an end a bitter family dispute. This poem has been described as 'one of the great poems of late medieval Wales'. Indeed, for some three centuries from the 15th century onwards, numerous Welsh poets were welcomed to Ynysymaengwyn and also to several of the most significant houses of Tywyn parish, most of whom were linked by blood or marriage to Ynysymaengwyn. Amongst these were Caethle, Dolau-gwyn, Gwyddgwion, Plas-yn-y-rofft (Esgairweddan), and Trefeddian.

'Sir' Arthur ap Huw (sometimes known as Arthur Hughes), a grandson of Hywel ap Siencyn of Ynysymaengwyn, was vicar of St Cadfan's church in Tywyn between 1555 and his death in 1570, and was also a notable patron of Welsh poets. He is also known for his translation into Welsh of George Marshall's counter-Reformation text A Compendious Treatise in Metre (1554). 'Sir' Arthur's nephew David Johns (sometimes known as David Jones or David ap John, fl. 1572–98) was another important figure in the Welsh Renaissance. A great-grandson of Hywel ap Siencyn, he copied an important manuscript of cywyddau (British Library Additional MS 14866) which includes several poems to the Ynysymaengwyn family (amongst them the poem by Tudur Aled mentioned above).

Hwmffre (or Humphrey) ap Hywel ap Siencyn of Ynysymaengwyn died in 1545 and was followed by his son John Wynn. He was followed by his son Humphrey Wynn. Upon his death, the estate passed to his daughter Elizabeth and her husband Sir James Pryse of Gogerddan, Cardiganshire, who both died in 1642. The failure to produce a male heir would prove to be the norm for the family from this point onwards.

== The Corbet family ==
Ynysymaengwyn was inherited by Sir James and Elizabeth's daughter Bridget who married Robert Corbet (d. 1644), the third son of Sir Vincent Corbet of Moreton Corbet, Shropshire. Robert Corbet was a Royalist during the English Civil War, during which Ynysymaengwyn was burnt to the ground to prevent it from falling into the hands of the Parliamentarians. Robert was followed by his son Vincent Corbet, who was followed by his son, another Vincent. On this Vincent's death in 1723, Ynysymaengwyn passed to his daughter Anne (d. 1760) who married Athelstan Owen (1676-1731) of Rhiwsaeson, Llanbryn-mair. Corbet Owen, the eldest son, died without issue in 1750, following which the Rhiwsaeson estate was sold. His mother then settled Ynysymaengwyn on her second son Richard. He also died childless, so the estate passed to her daughter Anne (d. 1767), who had married Pryce Maurice of Lloran, Llansilin in 1740.

In accordance with the wishes of Anne Owen (née Corbet), the estate then passed to the third son of Pryce and Anne Maurice, Henry Arthur Maurice. As required by the terms of the inheritance, he assumed the name of Corbet, but died at the age of 30 in 1782. He was succeeded by his eldest brother Edward, who also took the name Corbet. He spent several eventful decades as the squire of Ynysymaengwyn before dying in London in 1820. He left a daughter Eleanor (d. 1826), who married Thomas Powell (1745–97) of Nanteos, but his sons were illegitimate. The estate was inherited by his nephew Athelstan Maurice (who became Athelstan Corbet on inheritance), the son of his brother Pryce, who was rector of Llangelynnin and vicar of Tywyn from 1785 until his death in 1803. Athelstan Corbet (d. 1835) left no male heirs. His sister Henrietta Maurice married Charles Decimus Williames of Berth-ddu, Llandinam, and it was their daughter Henrietta Corbet Williames and her husband John Soden (later John Soden Corbet, d. 1871) of Bath who inherited Ynysymaengwyn. Their son Athelstan John Soden Corbet (formerly Athelstan John Soden Soden), heavily in debt, decided to sell the estate, and died young in 1878.

During the eighteenth and nineteenth centuries, the Corbet family of Ynysymaengwyn played a leading role in the Tywyn area. They were still patrons of Welsh culture in the eighteenth and early nineteenth centuries. Welsh poems to the family were added to David John's manuscript (see above) during the first part of the eighteenth century, when it was in the possession of the Reverend Edward Morgan. Morgan (d. 1749), a native of Llangelynnin and the brother of poet John Morgan, was vicar of St Cadfan's from 1717 and is also the subject of poems in David Johns' manuscript.

The Corbets were responsible for draining much of the morfa or salt marsh between the town and the Dysynni river, which greatly increased the land available for farming in that part of the parish. The estate was also famous for its gardens. The raven was the Corbet family emblem (the name 'Corbet' is thought to come from the Norman French for 'raven') and the bird is still used on the Tywyn town crest. The current Corbett Arms Hotel was formerly known as The Raven. One notable landlord was Griffith Owen (1750–1833), who had been both butler and harpist to the Corbets. A portrait of him by Benjamin Marshall (1768–1835) was formerly to be seen at Ynysymaengwyn.

== John Corbett (1817-1901) ==
Ynysymaengwyn was bought by John Corbett of Chateau Impney, Droitwich in 1878. He was not related to the previous Corbet family, but the thought of moving to an area whose residents were long accustomed to tugging a forelock at the mention of the name certainly appealed to him. Although not a permanent resident, Corbett spent long periods and even more money in Tywyn, and some of the town's key features are the product of his investments. He developed the water and sewerage system and also constructed the promenade at a cost of some £30,000. He gave land and money for the Market Hall, built to celebrate Queen Victoria's Diamond Jubilee in 1897. It was his money that enabled Brynarfor (formerly a private school) to be opened as 'Towyn Intermediate School' in 1894. He rebuilt the Corbett Arms Hotel (from then on spelled with two 't's), and also contributed to the Assembly Room (1893), now Tywyn Cinema. Plaques commemorating his generosity may still be seen on the north end of the promenade and on the Market Hall. Another commemorative plaque was on Brynarfor (now demolished), and his portrait was hung there when the school first opened. Despite the fact that his involvement transformed Tywyn, he was not much loved, and upon his death on 22 April 1901, the Cambrian News noted that "he had more than the usual reserve of the Englishman".

== Later years ==
John Corbett became legally separated from his wife Anna Eliza (née O'Meara) in 1884, and a court order prevented her from living within 40 miles of Corbett's homes. Upon his death in 1901 the estate went to his brother Dr Thomas Corbett. It was only on Thomas's death in 1906 that Ann Corbett (d. 1914) was able to return to a warm welcome from the local people, as her son Roger John Corbett (1863–1942) took over the estate. Following Roger's death his sister Mary (d. 1951) eventually gave the estate to the council. The council was unable to fund the necessary repairs, and the house was used for firefighting practice and army training and soon had to be demolished. A dovecote built by Ann Owen (d. 1760) still survives, and Ynysymaengwyn is now a Trust run by trustees (Tywyn town councillors) with part of the land used as a caravan and camping park.

== Archives ==
The most important collection of documents relating to the estate is found in the National Library of Wales amongst the Peniarth Estate Records. Also at the National Library are the Ynysymaengwyn Estate Miscellaneous Papers which relate to the early part of the twentieth century. Some nineteenth-century papers are held in the Meirionnydd Record Office of Gwynedd Archives (The Ynysymaengwyn Estate Papers).

A survey of the estate completed by Richard Owen in 1776 is also in the National Library of Wales, as are numerous portraits of family members.
