= Ystlyg =

Welsh medieval cantref

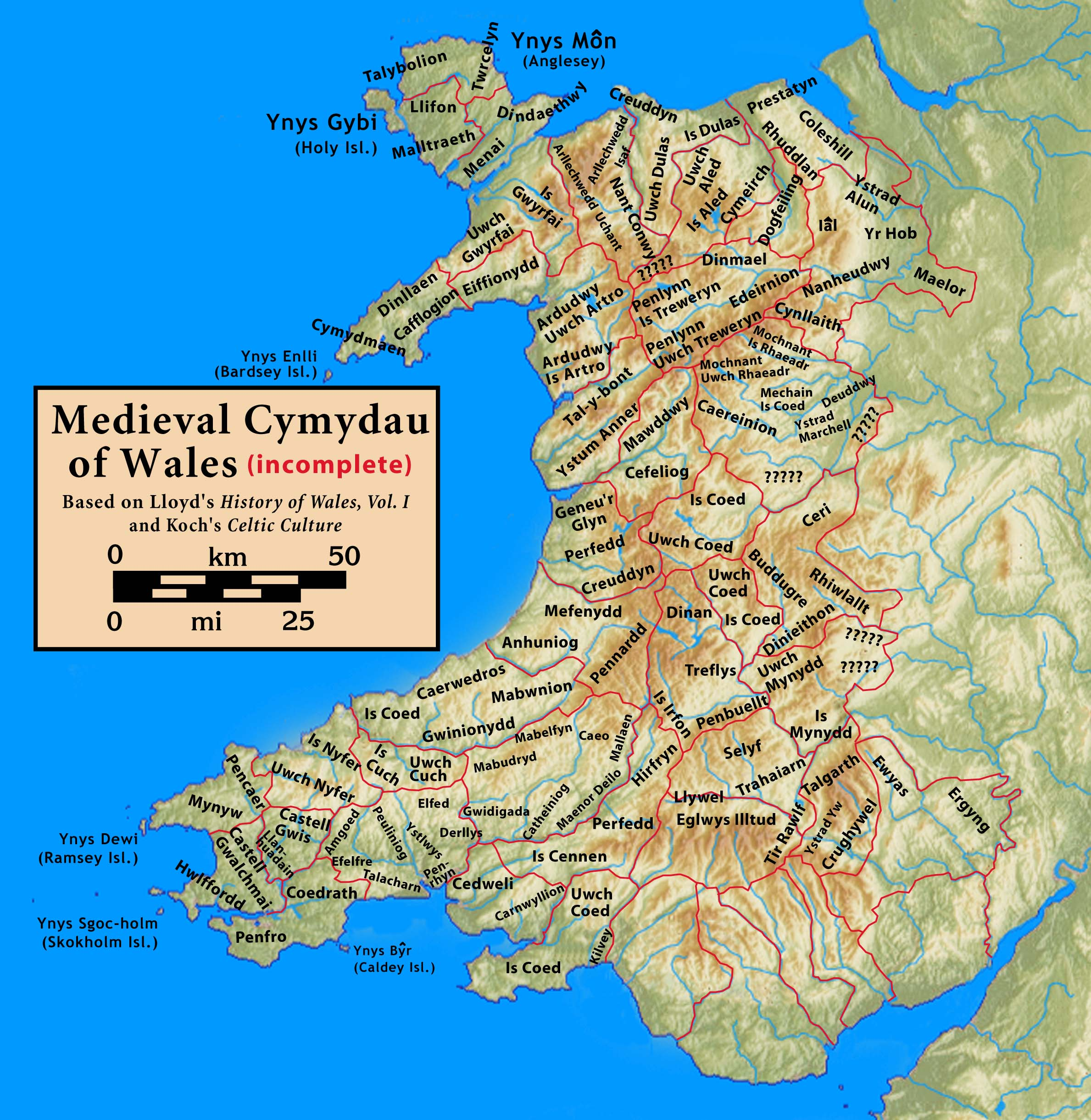
Medieval commotes of Wales (Llannerch Hudol and Y Gorddwr shown as question marks to the south and east respectively of Ystrad Marchell)

Ystlyg (English: possibly curve or open country) was a medieval cantref in the Kingdom of Powys. It lay at the east of the kingdom on the border with England. It consisted of the commotes (cymydau) of Deuddwr in the north, Ystrad Marchell in the centre, Llannerch Hudol (also written Llannerchwdwl, Llanerchydol or Llannerchudol) in the south, and Y Gorddwr (or Corddwr) in the east beyond the River Severn and Offa's Dyke.

Ystad Marchell, Llannerch Hudol and Deuddwr formed the Teirswydd (English: three [commotes] (literally, swydd is post as in an office)) which were among the lands restored into the possession of Gruffydd ap Gwenwynwyn in return for his homage and fealty by Llywelyn ap Gruffudd at Ystumanner in 1263. Y Gorddwr had remained under the control of the Corbet family (barons of Caus) and therefore the English king.

The cantref of Ystlyg (excluding Y Gorddwr) corresponds to the later hundred of Deuddwr.
