= Commote =

Welsh medieval land division

A commote (Welsh: cwmwd, sometimes spelt in older documents as cymwd, plural cymydau, less frequently cymydoedd) was a secular division of land in Medieval Wales. The word derives from the prefix cym- ("together", "with") and the noun bod ("home, abode"). The English word "commote" is derived from the Middle Welsh cymwt.

The basic unit of land was the tref, a small basic village or settlement. In theory, 100 trefi made up a cantref (literally, "one hundred settlements"; plural: cantrefi), and half or a third of a cantref was a cymwd, although in practice the actual numbers varied greatly. Together with the cantrefi, commotes were the geographical divisions through which defence and justice were organised. In charge of a commote would be a chieftain probably related to the ruling Prince of the Kingdom. His court would have been situated in a special tref, referred to as a maerdref. Here, the bonded villagers who farmed the chieftain's estate lived, together with the court officials and servants. Commotes were further divided into maenorau or maenolydd.

== Domesday Book and later history ==
Domesday Book has entries for those commotes that in 1086 were under Norman control, but still subject to Welsh law and custom. However, it refers to them using the Anglo-Norman word "commot" instead of hundred, the word used at the time for the equivalent land division in England. The commotes mentioned in the Domesday Book, in general, represented recent Anglo-Norman advances into Welsh territory. Although the commotes were assessed for military service and taxation, their obligations were rated in carucates (derived from Latin for cattle or oxen), not in hides as on the English side of the border.

The customs of the commotes are described in the Domesday accounts of the border earldoms of Gloucestershire, Herefordshire, Shropshire and Cheshire. The principal commotes described in Domesday were Archenfield, Ewias, and the commotes of Gwent in the south; Cynllaith, Edeirnion, and Iâl (Shropshire accounts); and Englefield, Rhos and Rhufoniog (Cheshire accounts).

In legal usage, the English word 'commote' replaced cwmwd following the Edwardian conquest of Wales in the 13th century, when English was made the official language for all legal documents. The Welsh, most of whom knew not a word of English, naturally continued to use cwmwd and still do so today. In much of Wales, commotes had become more important than cantrefi by the mid-13th century and administration of Welsh law became the responsibility of the commote court rather than the cantref court. Owain Glyndŵr called representatives from the commotes for his two parliaments during the rising of 1400–1409.

The boundaries of commotes, or in some cases cantrefi, were in many cases subsequently more accurately represented by church rural deaneries than by the hundreds issuing from the 16th century Acts of Union.

== Is and Uwch in commote names ==
A considerable number of the names of adjacent medieval Welsh commotes contain is (meaning "lower", or "below" as a preposition) and uwch (originally uch and meaning "higher", or "above" as a preposition), with the dividing line between them being a natural boundary, such as a river, mountain or forest. Melville Richards noted that, in almost every instance where this occurs, the point of central authority was in the "is division" when the commote was named, and he suggested that such commotes were originally named in the sense of 'nearer' and 'farther' based on the location of that central authority—i.e., the terminology is for administrative purposes and not a geographical characterisation.

Richards attributed the use of is and uwch to some confusion in translating Latin sub (meaning "lower") and supra (meaning "upper") into Welsh in too literal a sense, when the proper sense was to consider sub to be an administrative synonym for Latin cis (meaning "this side of"), and to consider supra to be an administrative synonym for Latin trans (meaning "the other side of").

A number of smaller units, such as manors, parishes and townships, also use the administrative distinction of is and uwch, sometimes in their Latin forms (e.g., the manor of Clydach in Uwch Nyfer, divided into Sub Clydach and Ultra (Supra) Clydach).

This is unrelated to the common use of isaf and uchaf in farm names, where the terms are used in the geographical sense.

== List of commotes, organised by cantref ==
The Red Book of Hergest (1375–1425) provides a detailed list of commotes in the late 14th and early 15th centuries. The list has some overlaps and is ambiguous in parts, especially in the Gwynedd section. It should also be borne in mind that the number and organisation of the commotes was different in the earlier Middle Ages; some of the units and divisions listed here are late creations. The original orthography of the manuscript is given here together with the standard modern Welsh equivalents.

=== Gwynedd ===
- Cantref Tegigyl (Cantref Tegeingl):
  - Kymwt Insel (Cwmwd Insel)
  - Kymwt Prestan (Cwmwd Prestatyn)
  - Kymwt Rudlan (Cwmwd Rhuddlan)
- Cantref Dyffryn Clwyt (Cantref Dyffryn Clwyd):
  - Kymwt Colyan (Cwmwd Colian)
  - Kymwt Llannerch (Cwmwd Llannerch)
  - Kymwt Ystrat (Cwmwd Ystrad)
- Cantref Rywynyawc (Cantref Rhufoniog)
  - Kymwt Rhuthyn (Cwmwd Rhuthyn)
  - Kymwt Uch Alech (Cwmwd Uwch Aled)
  - Kymwt Is Alech (Cwmwd Is Aled)
- Cantref Rhos
  - Kymwt Uch Dulas (Cwmwd Uwch Dulas)
  - Kymwt Is Dulas (Cwmwd Is Dulas)
  - Kymwt Y kreudyn (Cwmwd Creuddyn)
- Cantrefoed Mon (Anglesey) – Aberffraw, Cemais, Rhosyr
  - Kymwt Llan Uaes (Cwmwd Llanfaes, properly called Dindaethwy)
  - Kymwt Kemeis (Cwmwd Cemais)
  - Kymwt Talebolyon (Cwmwd Talebolyon)
  - Kymwt Aberffraw (Cwmwd Aberffraw)
  - Kymwt Penn Rhos (Cwmwd Penrhos)
  - Kymwt Rosvyrr (Cwmwd Rhosyr)
- Cantref Arllechwed (Cantref Arllechwedd)
  - Kymwt Treffryw (Cwmwd Trefriw)
  - Kymwt Aber (Cwmwd Aber)
- Cantref Aruon (Cantref Arfon)
  - Kymwt Uch Konwy (Cwmwd Uwch Conwy)
  - Kymwt Is Conwy (Cwmwd Is Conwy)
- Cantref Dinodyn
  - Kymwt Rifnot
  - Kymwt Ardudwy (Cwmwd Ardudwy)
- Cantref Llyyn (Cantref Llŷn)
  - Kymwt Dinmael (Cwmwd Dinmael)
  - Kymwt is Clogyon (Cwmwd Is Clogion
  - Kymwt Cwmdinam (Cwmwd Cwm Dinam)
- Cantref Meiryonyd (Cantref Meirionnydd)
  - Kymwt Eftumaneyr (Cwmwd Ystumaner)
  - Kymwt Talybont (Cwmwd Tal-y-bont)
- Cantref Eryri
  - Kymwt Cyueilawc (Cwmwd Cyfeiliog)
  - Kymwt Madeu
  - Kymwt Uch Meloch
  - Kymwt Is Meloch
  - Kymwt Llan Gonwy (Cwmwd Llangonwy)
  - Kymwt Dinmael (Cwmwd Dinmael)
  - Kymwt Glyndyudwy (Cwmwd Glyndyfrdwy)

=== Powys ===
- Cantrefoed Powys Madawc
  - Kymwt Iaal (Cwmwd Iâl, later "Yale")
  - Kymwt Ystrad Alun
  - Kymwt Yr Hop (Cwmwd Yr Hob, later "Hope")
  - Kymwt Berford
  - Kymwt Wnknan
  - Kymwt Trefwenn
  - Kymwt Croesosswallt
  - Kymwt y Creudyn
  - Kymwt Nant Odyn
  - Kymwt Ceuenbleid (possibly Cwmwd Cynllaith)
  - Kymwt Is Raeadyr (Cwmwd Mochnant Is Rhaiadr)
- Cantrefoed Powys Gwennwynwyn
  - Kymwt Uch Raeadyr (Cwmwd Mochnant Uwch Rhaiadr)
  - Kymwt Deu Dyswr (Cwmwd Deuddwr in cantref Ystlyg)
  - Kymwt Llannerchwdwl (Cwmwd Llanerch Hudol in cantref Ystlyg)
  - Kymwt Ystrad Marchell (in cantref Ystlyg)
  - Kymwt Mecheyn (Cwmwd Mechain Is Coed and Cwmwd Mechain Uwch Coed)
  - Kymwt Caer Einon (Caereinion)
  - Kymwt Uch Affes
  - Kymwt Is Affes
  - Kymwt Uch Coet (Cwmwd Uwch Coed in cantref Arwystli)
  - Kymwt Is Coet (Cwmwd Is Coed in cantref Arwystli)

=== Maelienydd ===
- Cantrefoed Maelenyd
  - Kymwt Ceri
  - Kymwt Gwerthrynnyon
  - Kymwt Swyd Uudugre
  - Kymwt Swyd Yethon
  - Kymwt Llwythyfnwc

=== Buellt ===
- Cantref Buellt
  - Kymwt Penn Buellt (Cwmwd Pen Buellt)
  - Kymwt Swydman (Cwmwd Swyddfan(?) : Cwmwd Dinan)
  - Kymwt Treflys (Cwmwd Treflys)
  - Kymwt Is Iruon (Cwmwd Is Irfon)

=== Elfael ===
- Cantref Eluael (Cantref Elfael)
  - Kymwt Uch Mynyd (Cwmwd Uwch Mynydd)
  - Kymwt Is Mynyd (Cwmwd Is Mynyd)

=== Brecheinawc (Brycheiniog) ===
- Cantref Selyf
  - Kymwt Brwynllys (Cwmwd Brwynllys)
  - Kymwt Talgarth (Cwmwd Talgarth)
- Cantref Tewdos
  - Kymwt Dyffryn Hodni (Cwmwd Dyffryn Hoddni)
  - Kymwt Llywel (Cwmwd Llys Hywel)
  - Kymwt Tir Rawlf (Cwmwd Tir Rawlff)
- Cantref Ida
  - Kymwt Ystrat Yw (Cwmwd Ystrad Yw)
  - Kymwt Cruc Howel (Cwmwd Crughywel)
  - Kymwt Evyas (Cwmwd Euyas)

=== Ystrad Tywi ===
- Cantref Bychan
  - Kymwt Hirvryn
  - Kymwt Perued
  - Kymwt Iskennen
- Cantref Eginawc (Eginog)
  - Kymwt Kedweli (Cydweli)
  - Kymwt Carnywyllawn (Carnwyllion or Carnwyllon now Llanelli)
  - Kymwt Gwhyr (Gŵyr now Swansea)
- Cantref Mawr
  - Kymwt Mallaen
  - Kymwt Caeaw
  - Kymwt Maenawr Deilaw
  - Kymwt Cetheinawc
  - Kymwt Mab Eluyw
  - Kymwt Mab Utryt
  - Kymwt Widigada

=== Ceredigyawn (Ceredigion) ===
- Cantref Penweddig
  - Kymwt Geneurglyn (Cwmwd Genau'r Glyn)
  - Kymwt Perued (Cwmwd Perfedd)
  - Kymwt Creudyn (Cwmwd Creuddyn)
- Cantref Mabwynyon (Cantref Mabwnion)
  - Kymwt Meuenyd (Cwmwd Mefenydd)
  - Kymwt Anhunyawc (Cwmwd Anhuniog)
  - Kymwt Pennard (Cwmwd Penardd)
- Cantref Caer Wedros (Cantref Caerwedros)
  - Kymwt Wenyionid (Cwmwd Gwinionydd)
  - Kymwt Is Coed (Cwmwd Is Coed)

=== Dyfed ===
- Cantref Cemeis (Cemais)
  - Kymwt Is Neuer (Cemais Is Nyfer)
  - Kymwt Uch Neuer (Cemais Uwch Nyfer)
- Cantref Deugledyf (Daugleddyf)
  - Kymwt Castel Hu (Castell Gwis)
  - Kymwt Llan y Hadein (Llanhuadain)
- Cantref Emlyn
  - Kymwt Is Cuch (Emlyn Is Cuch)
  - Kymwt Uch Cuch (Emlyn Uwch Cuch)
- Cantref Wartha (Gwarthaf)
  - Kymwt Amgoet (Amgoed)
  - Kymwt Derllys (Derllys)
  - Kymwt y Uelfre (Efelfre)
  - Kymwt Eluyd (Elfed)
  - Kymwt Pennryn (Penrhyn)
  - Kymwt Peluneawc (Peuliniog)
  - Kymwt Talacharn (Talacharn)
  - Kymwt Estyrlwyf (Ystlwys)
- Cantref Pebideawc (Pebidiog)
  - Kymwt Menew (Mynyw)
  - Kymwt Penncaer (Pencaer)
- Cantref Pennbrwc (Penfro)
  - Coedrath
  - Penfro
- Cantref Rhos (Rhos)
  - Kymwt Castell Gwalchmei (Castell Gwalchmei)
  - Kymwt Hawlfford (Hwlffordd)

=== Morgannwg ===
- Cantref Gorvynyd
  - Kymwt Rwng Net A Thawy
  - Kymwt Tir Yr Hwndryt
  - Kymwt Rwng Neth ac Avyn
  - Kymwt Tir Yr Iarll
  - Kymwt Y Coety
  - Kymwt Maenawr Glyn Ogwr
- Cantref Penn Ychen
  - Kymwt Meisgyn
  - Kymwt Glyn Rodne
  - Kymwt Maenawr Tal y Vann
  - Kymwt Maenawr Ruthyn
- Cantref Breinyawl
  - Kymwt Is Caech
  - Kymwt Uch Caech
  - Kymwt Kibwr (Ceibwr; later Kibbor)
- Cantref Gwynllwc
  - Kymwt Yr Heid
  - Kymwt Ydref Berued
  - Kymwt Edelygyon
  - Kymwt Eithyaf
  - Kymwt Y Mynyd
- Cantref Gwent
  - Kymwt Is Coed
  - Kymwt Llemynyd
  - Kymwt Tref y Gruc
  - Kymwt Uch Coed
