= Cantref =

Medieval Welsh land division

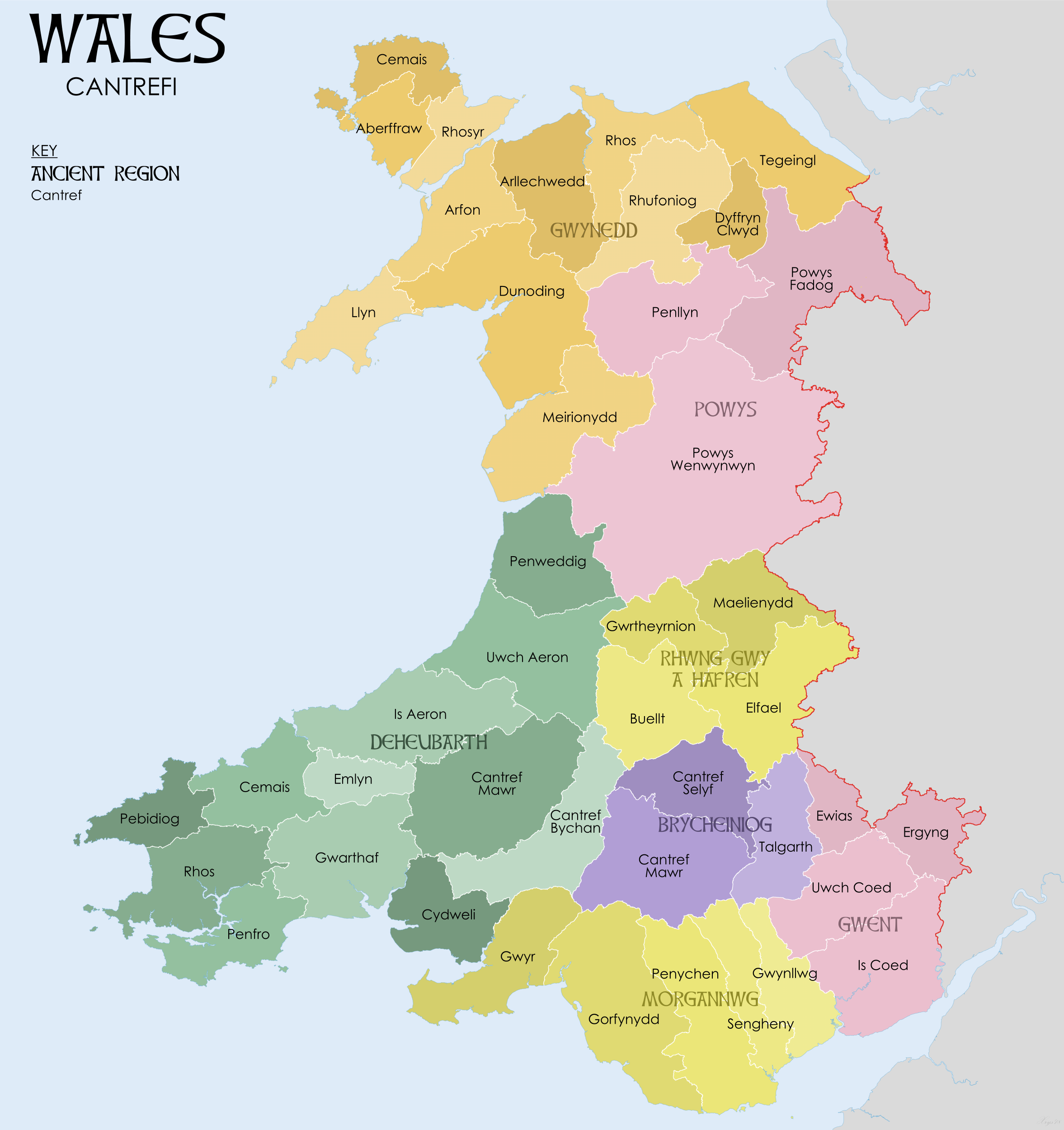
Cantrefi of Medieval Wales

A cantref (/ˈkæntrɛv/ KAN-trev; Welsh pronunciation: [ˈkantrɛ(v)]; plural cantrefi or cantrefs; also rendered as cantred) was a medieval Welsh land division, particularly important in the administration of Welsh law.

== Description ==
Land in medieval Wales was divided into cantrefi, which were themselves divided into smaller cymydau (commotes). The word cantref is derived from cant ("a hundred") and tref ("town" in modern Welsh, but formerly used for much smaller settlements). The cantref is thought to be the original unit, with the commotes being a later division. Cantrefi could vary considerably in size: most were divided into two or three commotes, but the largest, the Cantref Mawr (or "Great Cantref") in Ystrad Tywi (now in Carmarthenshire) was divided into seven commotes.

== History ==
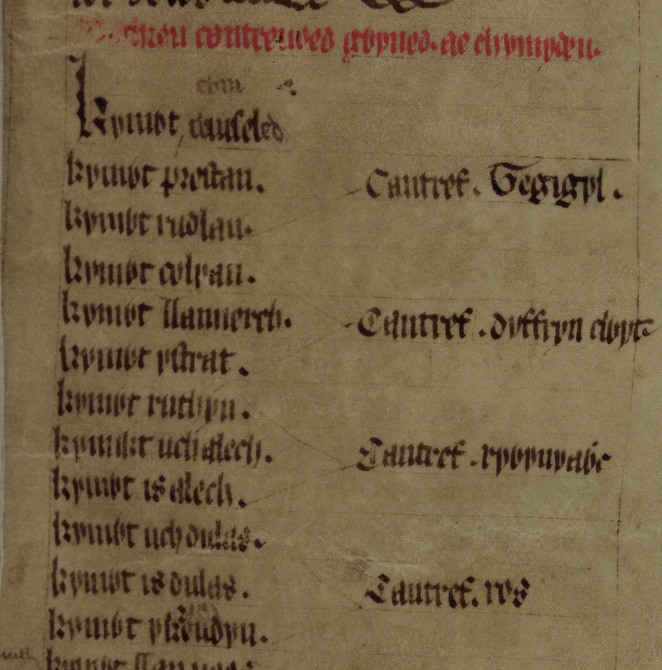
List of hundreds (left) and cantrefi (right) from the Red Book of Hergest pre-1285

The antiquity of the cantrefi is demonstrated by the fact that they often mark the boundary between dialects. Some were originally kingdoms in their own right; others may have been artificial units created later.

Cantrefi were of particular importance in the administration of Welsh law. Each cantref had its own court, which was an assembly of the uchelwyr, the main landowners of the cantref. This would be presided over by the king if he happened to be present, or if he was not present, by his representative. Apart from the judges there would be a clerk, an usher and sometimes two professional pleaders. The cantref court dealt with crimes, the determination of boundaries, and inheritance. The commote court later took over many of the functions of the cantref court, and in some areas the names of the commotes are much better known than the name of the cantref of which they formed parts.

== The Cantrefi of Wales ==
Deheubarth	Kingdom of Gwent	Kingdom of Gwynedd	Kingdom of Powys	Morgannwg	Rhwng Gwy a Hafren
Penweddig; Is Aeron; Uwch Aeron; Cemais; Pebidiog; Rhos; Deugleddyf; Penfro; Gwarthaf; Emlyn; Y Cantref Mawr; Y Cantref Bychan; Eginog	Ergyng; Ewias; Gwent Is-coed; Gwent Uch-coed	Arllechwedd; Cemais; Aberffraw; Rhosyr; Arfon; Llŷn; Dunoding; Rhos; Rhufoniog; Dyffryn Clwyd; Tegeingl	Penllyn; Powys Fadog; Maelor; Swydd y Waun; Ystlyg; Powys Wenwynwyn; Arwystli; Cedewain; Cyfeiliog; Caereinion; Mechain; Mochnant	Gorfynydd; Gwynllwg; Gŵyr; Penychen; Senghenydd	Gwrtheyrnion; Elfael; Maelienydd; Buellt

== Lost Cantrefi ==
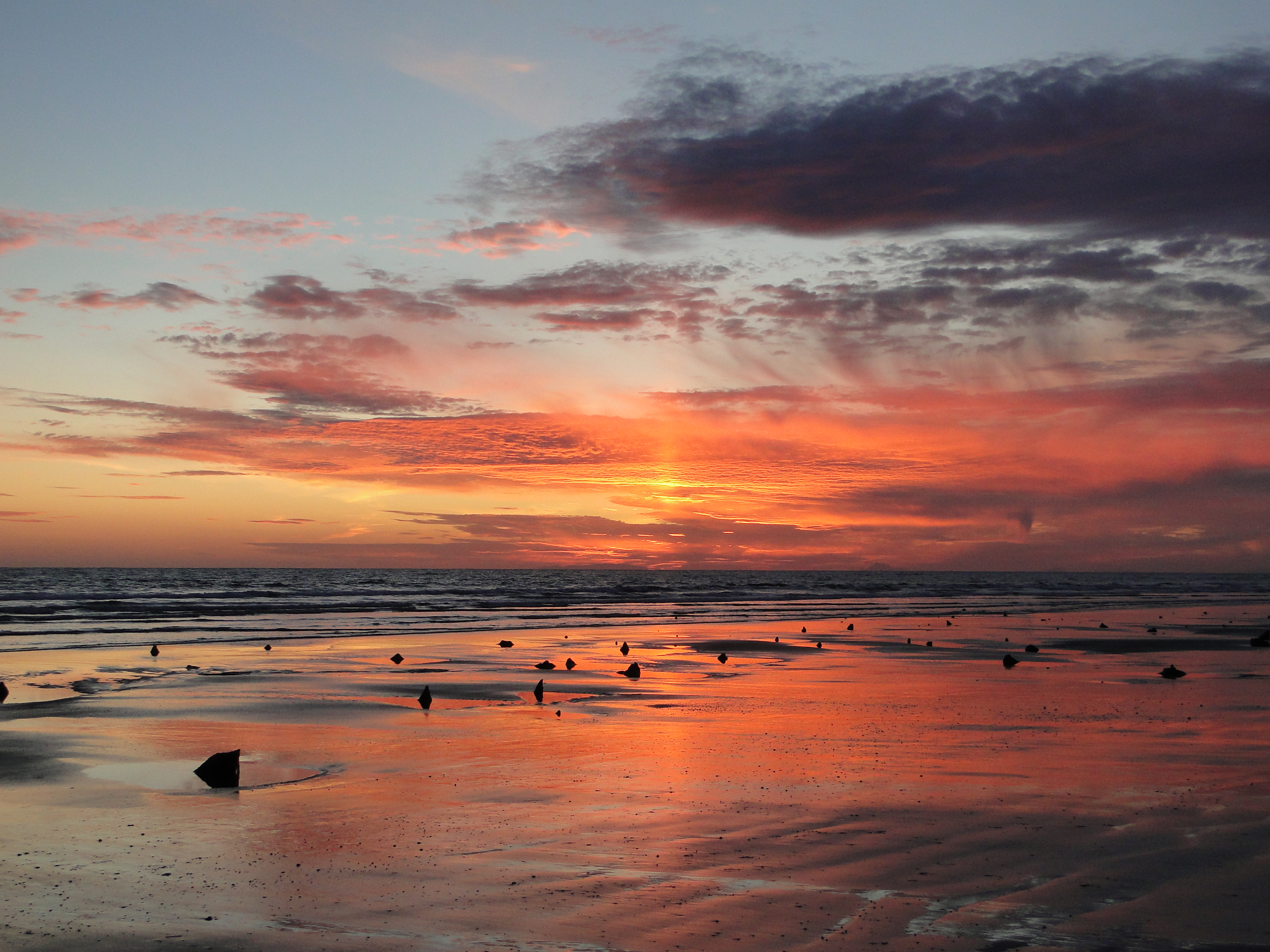
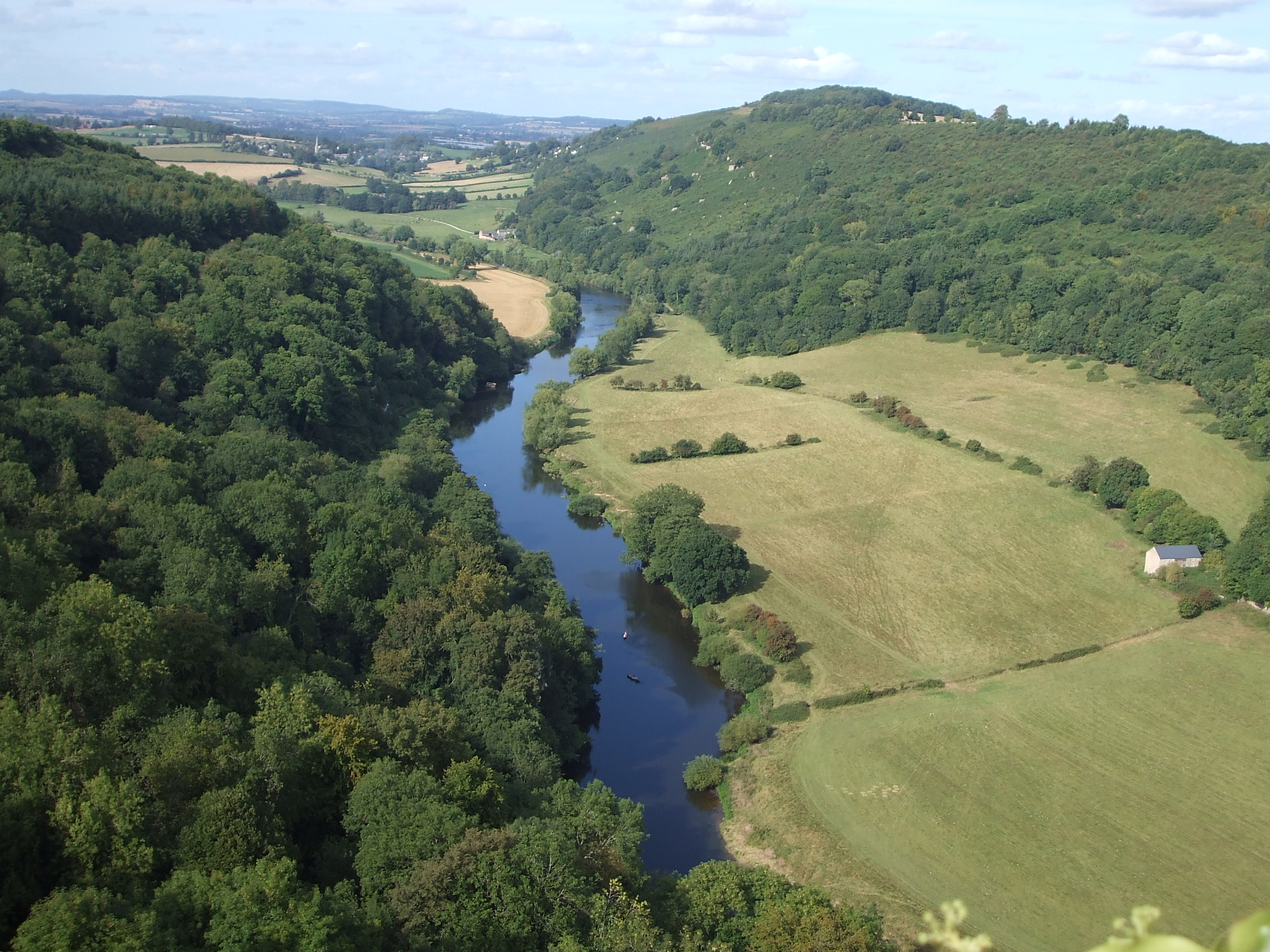
The remains of an ancient submerged forest along the western coast of Wales (long associated with Cantre'r Gwaelod) and the banks of the river Wye, the ancient western boundary of Cantref Coch.

Cantre'r Gwaelod is an ancient sunken kingdom said to have occupied a tract of fertile land lying in Cardigan Bay. First mentioned in the Black Book of Carmarthen, the cantref is a recurring topic in Welsh literature and Welsh mythology. In one version of the story, Seithenyn, a prince of the kingdom, is a notorious drunk and it was through his negligence that the sea swept through the open floodgates, flooding the land forever.

Cantref Coch is associated with the Forest of Dean, Gloucestershire, and defined as the land between the River Severn and the River Wye. It was traditionally part of the kingdom of Ergyng but would, in later times, be recorded as part of the kingdoms of Gwent and Morgannwg. The Cantref was annexed into the Kingdom of England in 926 by king Æthelstan.

== See also ==
- Cantref Coch
- Cantre'r Gwaelod
- Hundred (county division)
- List of hundreds of Wales

== Further study ==
- Kocourek, Albert; Wigmore, John H., eds. (1915). "Laws of Howel Dda". Sources of Ancient and Primitive Law. Translated by Owen, Aneurin. Boston: Little, Brown, and Company. pp. 519–553.
- Lewis, Hubert (1889). Lloyd, John Edward (ed.). The Ancient Laws of Wales. London: Elliot Stock.
- Probert, William, ed. (1823). The Ancient Laws of Cambria. London: E. Williams.
- Richards, G. Melville (1969). Welsh Administrative and Territorial Units, Medieval and Modern. Cardiff: University of Wales Press.
- Seebohm, Frederic (1904) [1895]. The Tribal System in Wales (2nd ed.). London: Longmans, Green, and Co.
