= Kingdom of Gwynedd =

Kingdom in northwest Wales, c. 500–1283

Kingdom of Gwynedd Guined (Old Welsh) GỼynet (Middle Welsh) Venedotia / Nor(th)wallia (Latin) (Note: Venedotia may also be rendered as Guenedot(i)a, reflecting the Old Welsh spelling Guined. Welsh charters only render the name as Norwallia or Northwallia, derived from Old English Norþwealas. The Latin Life of Gruffudd ap Cynan equates Venedotia and Northwallia.)
- c. 500 – 1283
- Arms of Gruffudd ap Llywelyn, Dafydd ap Llywelyn, and Llywelyn ap Gruffudd

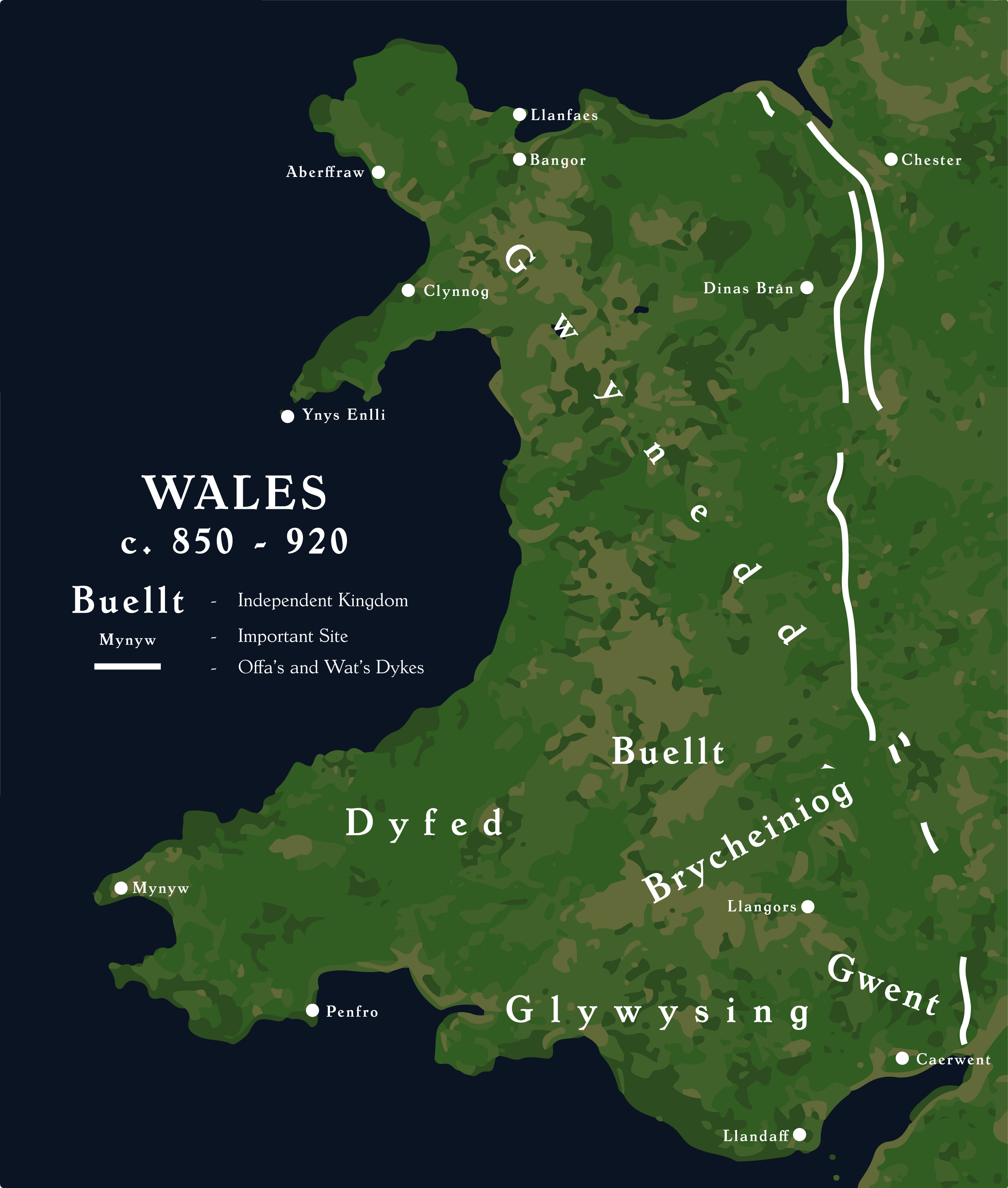
- Capital: None, with a 'chief' court at Aberffraw
- Common languages: Old Welsh, Middle Welsh, Latin
- Religion: Roman Catholicism
- Government: Monarchy
- Monarch
  - c. 520 – 547: Maelgwn Gwynedd (first attested)
  - 1282 – 1283: Dafydd ap Gruffudd (last)
- Distain
  - before 1170? (tenure uncertain): Llywarch ap Brân
  - c. 1190s – c. 1217: Gwyn ab Ednywain
  - c. 1217 – 1246: Ednyfed Fychan
  - 1256 – 1268: Goronwy ab Ednyfed Fychan
  - 1268 – 1281: Tudur ab Ednyfed Fychan
  - 1281 – 1282: Dafydd ab Einion Fychan
- Historical era: Middle Ages
  - First appearance as VENEDOTI[A]: c. 500
  - Battle of Heavenfield: 634
  - Accession of the Second Dynasty: c. 825
  - Rule of Gruffudd ap Cynan: 1101 – 1137
  - Overlordship of Llywelyn ab Iorwerth: 1216 – 1240
  - Treaty of Montgomery, Llywelyn ap Gruffudd made Prince of Wales: 29 September 1267
  - Treaty of Aberconwy: 9 November 1277
  - Death of Llywelyn ap Gruffudd: 11 December 1282
  - Statute of Rhuddlan: 1284
- Currency: keynyauc (c. 1250)
| Preceded by | Succeeded by |
| Ordovices | Conquest of Wales by Edward I |
- Today part of: Wales

The Kingdom of Gwynedd was a Welsh kingdom which first appeared at the turn of the sixth century. Based in northwest Wales, the rulers of Gwynedd repeatedly rose to dominance and were acclaimed as "King of the Britons" before losing their power in civil wars or invasions. The kingdom of Gruffudd ap Llywelyn—the King of Wales from 1055 to 1063—was shattered by a Saxon invasion in 1063 just prior to the Norman invasion of Wales, but the House of Aberffraw restored by Gruffudd ap Cynan slowly recovered and Llywelyn the Great of Gwynedd was able to proclaim the Principality of Wales at the Aberdyfi gathering of Welsh princes in 1216. In 1277, the Treaty of Aberconwy between Edward I of England and Llywelyn's grandson Llywelyn ap Gruffudd granted peace between the two but would also guarantee that Welsh self-rule would end upon Llywelyn's death, and so it represented the completion of the first stage of the conquest of Wales by Edward I.

Welsh tradition credited the founding of Gwynedd to figures from Manaw Gododdin, perhaps the region around the mouth of the Firth of Forth, invading the lands of the Brittonic polities of the Deceangli, Ordovices, and Gangani in the 5th century. The sons of their leader, Cunedda, were said to have possessed the land between the rivers Dee and Teifi. The true borders of the realm varied over time, but Gwynedd proper was generally thought to comprise the cantrefs of Aberffraw, Cemais, and Cantref Rhosyr on Anglesey and Arllechwedd, Arfon, Dunoding, Dyffryn Clwyd, Llŷn, Rhos, Rhufoniog, and Tegeingl at the mountainous mainland region of Snowdonia opposite.

== Etymology ==
The name Gwynedd is believed to be a borrowing from early Irish (reflective of Irish settlement in the area in antiquity), either cognate with the Old Irish ethnic name Féni, 'Irish people', from Primitive Irish*weidh-n- 'forest people' or 'wild people' (from Proto-Indo-European *weydʰ- 'wood, wilderness'), or alternatively Old Irish fían 'war band', from Proto-Celtic *weinā (from Proto-Indo-European *weyh₁- 'chase, pursue, suppress').

Ptolemy in the 1st century marked the Llŷn Peninsula as the "Promontory of the Gangani", which is also a name he recorded in Ireland. It is theorised in the 1st century BC some of the Gangani tribe may have landed in what is now the Llŷn Peninsula and had driven out the Deceangli or the Ordovices tribe from that area either peacefully or by force. In the late and post-Roman eras, Irish from Leinster may have arrived in Anglesey and elsewhere in northwest Wales with the name Llŷn derived from Laigin, an Old Irish form that means 'Leinstermen', or simply 'Leinster'.

The 5th-century Cantiorix Inscription now in Penmachno church seems to be the earliest record of the name. It is in memory of a man named Cantiorix, and the Latin inscription is Cantiorix hic iacit / Venedotis cives fuit / consobrinos Magli magistrati: "Cantiorix lies here. He was a citizen of Gwynedd and a cousin of Maglos the magistrate". The use of terms such as "citizen" and "magistrate" may be cited as evidence that Romano-British culture and institutions continued in Gwynedd long after the legions had withdrawn.

== History, background and familial descent ==
The background involving the Kingdom of Gwynedd starts with the history of Wales. After the last ice age, Wales was settled during the prehistoric times. Neolithic sites have been discovered with tools made from flint, such as near Llanfaethlu, a long house excavated from 6000 years ago. Further examples of human activity in Gwynedd and Anglesey are involved in places such as Bryn Celli Ddu on Anglesey, which was built in phases starting 5000 years ago. Archeological findings from the Bronze Age, millennia ago, include findings such as the Arthog cauldron, a bronze cauldron from 1100 BC found near the Merioneth border, also named 'The Nannau Bucket' (similar to the Dowris bucket). And the Moel Hebog shield which is also 3,000 years old (similar to the Rhyd-y-gors example), and more recently the Trawsfynydd tankard, which was used to drink mead and beer between 100 BC and 75 AD.

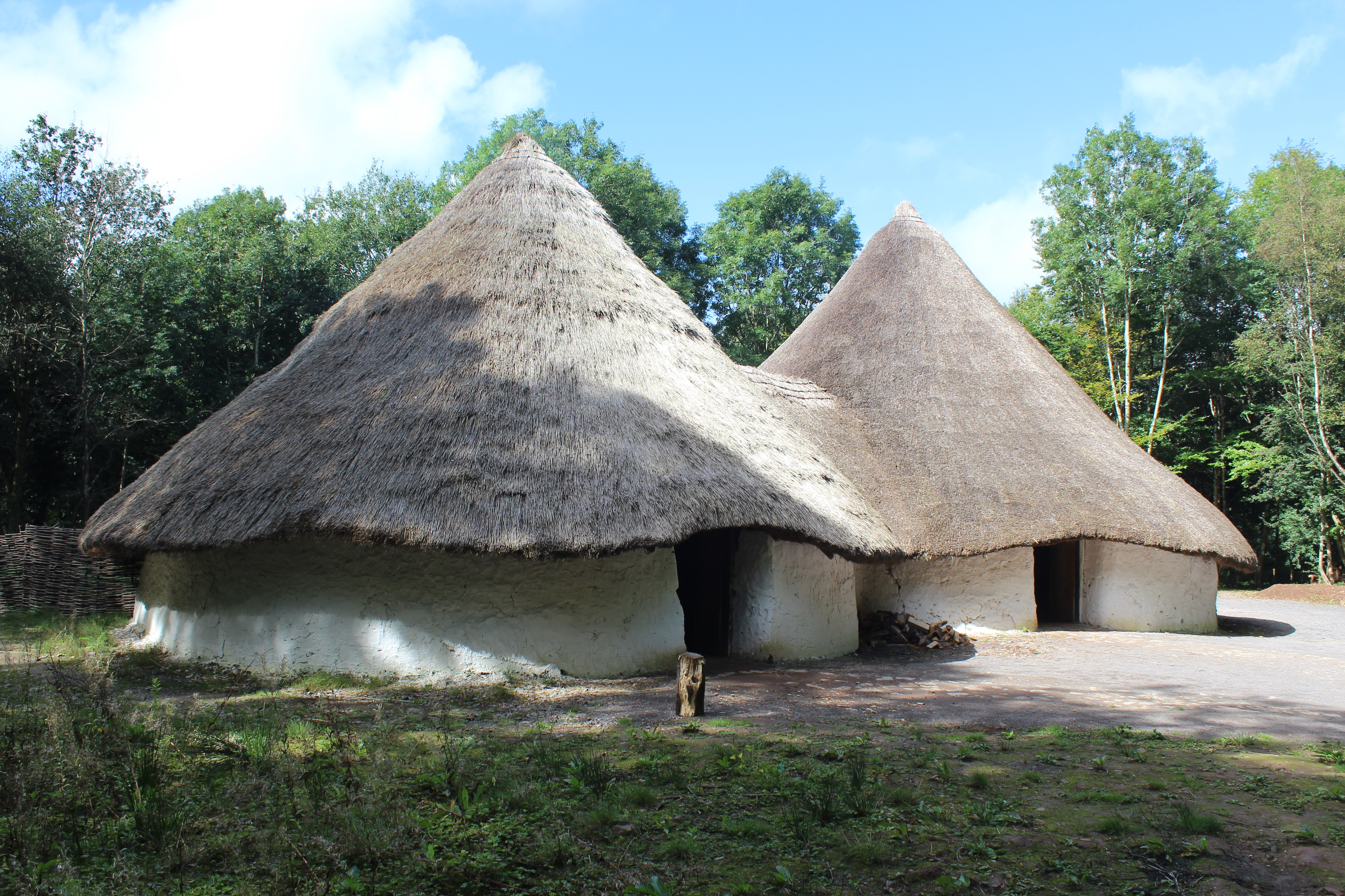
Bryn Eryr, recreation of pre Roman roundhouse, it's a 2,000-year-old Celtic Iron Age home.

Examples of early settlement in Gwynedd are Bryn Eryr near Llansadwrn, Anglesey, now found at the St Fagans National Museum of History, and Garn Boduan, a Celtic hillfort on the Llŷn Peninsula. Iron Age forts were being adapted until after the Roman conquest of Britain, 'Castle of Buan' (Garn Boduan) in Llŷn was recorded as being fortified until the 7th century. During the Roman period, new roads and forts were constructed throughout the Roman empire and for centuries in Wales and England, Welsh examples include Caer Gybi (fort) on Anglesey, and Segontium in Caernarfon, Gwynedd. The establishment of Christianity in Wales also gave rise to a new era; the Romans founded towns with churches and installed governors. During the centuries of sub-Roman Britain, new political structures were established. The Brythonic Kingdom of Gwynedd was established in the 5th century, and it proved to be the most durable of these Brythonic states, surviving until the late 13th century.

Boundaries and names emerging from the 1st millennium AD onwards are still being used today to define towns and counties of the region. Noteworthy descendants from the Kingdom of Gwynedd include royalty such as Owain Glyndŵr, and the titular Prince of Wales, also the Salusbury family via Katheryn of Berain. The people mentioned can be associated with the Anglesey-based Tudors of Penmynydd family. The Tudors were ancestors and namesakes of the former English Royal House of Tudor; they were descended from the Welshman Maredudd ap Tudur, Ednyfed Fychan (whose family were seneschals to the Kings of Gwynedd) being his famous ancestor. The Tudor dynasty became ancestors to the House of Stuart, and the Stuarts formed the European Jacobite family, they include direct descendants in the United Kingdom, Ireland, France, Germany, Italy and other countries on the continent of Europe, and all around the world.

== Gwynedd in the Early Middle Ages ==
=== Cunedda and his sons ===
The region became known as Venedotia in Latin. The name was initially attributed to a specific Irish colony on Anglesey but broadened to refer to Irish settlers as a whole in North Wales by the 5th century. According to the 9th-century monk and chronicler Nennius, North Wales was left defenceless by the Roman withdrawal and subject to increasing raids by marauders from the Isle of Man and Ireland, a situation which led Cunedda, his sons and their entourage, to migrate in the mid-5th century from Manaw Gododdin (now Clackmannanshire) to settle and defend North Wales against the raiders and bring the region within Romano-British control. Whether they were invited to keep out the invaders or were raiders themselves, however, is unknown. According to traditional pedigrees, Cunedda's grandfather was Padarn Beisrudd, Paternus of the red cloak, "an epithet which suggests that he wore the cloak of a Roman officer", and perhaps it was evidence of a high-ranking officer. (Note: Nennius translated by John Allen Giles who wrote that Cunedda arrived in Gwynedd 146 years before the reign of his great-grandson Maelgwn backdated in the usual Welsh Calendrical calculations from his death date in 547, which makes 401 the year of his arrival.) Cunedda (fl. 5th century) brought order to North Wales and after his death, Gwynedd was divided among his sons: Dynod was awarded Dunoding, another son Ceredig received Ceredigion," Afloeg by Aflogion in Lleyn, Dogfael by Dogfeiling in Dyffryn Clwyd, and Edern by Edeirnion ... Osfeilion of Osfael has not yet been located; Tybion, the eldest son, is said to have died in Manaw Gododdin, but his son Meirion (Marianus) comes into the picture as lord of Meirionydd. Einion Yrth completes the number". Cadwallon Lawhir ap Einion one of his grandsons, was the final leader to defeat the Irish on Anglesey. However, this overly neat origin myth has been met with skepticism, (Note: Assessment from Davies novel 1994.)

"Early Welsh literature contains a wealth of stories seeking to explain place-names, and doubtless, the story is propaganda aimed at justifying the right of Cunedda and his descendants to territories beyond the borders of the original Kingdom of Gwynedd. That kingdom probably consisted of the two banks of the Menai Straits and the coast over towards the estuary of the River Conwy, the foundations upon which Cunedda's descendants created a more extensive realm."

The inhabitants of Gwynedd remained conscious of their Romano-British heritage, and an affinity with Rome survived long after the Empire retreated from Britain, particularly with the use of Latin in writing and sustaining the Christian religion. The ruling classes continued to emphasise Roman ancestors within their pedigrees as a way to link their rule with the old imperial Roman order, suggesting stability and continuity with that old order. According to Professor John Davies, "[T]here is a determinedly Brythonic, and indeed Roman, air to early Gwynedd." So palpable was the Roman heritage felt that Professor Bryan Ward-Perkins of Trinity College, Oxford, wrote, "it took until 1282, when Edward I conquered Gwynedd, for the last part of Roman Britain to fall [and] a strong case can be made for Gwynedd as the very last part of the entire Roman Empire, east and west, to fall to the barbarians." (Note: It took until 1282, when Edward I conquered Gwynedd, for the last part of Roman Britain to fall. Indeed a strong case can be made for Gwynedd as the very last part of the entire Roman Empire, east and west, to fall to the barbarians. (If we take into account the temporary capture of Constantinople by 'Franks' in 1204, and of various Persian, Slav, Avar, and Seljuk invasions of Byzantine territory.)" Ward-Perkins was elaborating on an observation by J. Campbell,) Nevertheless, there was generally quick abandonment of Roman political, social, and ecclesiastical practices and institutions within Gwynedd and elsewhere in Wales. Roman knowledge was lost as the Romano-Britons shifted towards a streamlined militaristic near-tribal society that no longer included the use of coinage and other complex industries dependent on a money economy, architectural techniques using brick and mortar, and even more basic knowledge such as the use of the wheel in pottery production. Ward-Perkins suggests the Welsh had to abandon those Roman ways that proved insufficient, or indeed superfluous, to meet the challenge of survival they faced: "Militarized tribal societies, despite their political fragmentation and internecine strife, seem to have offered better protection against Germanic invasion than exclusive dependence on a professional Roman army (that in the troubled years of the fifth century was all too prone to melt away or mutiny)."

Reverting to a more militaristic tribal society allowed the Welsh of Gwynedd to concentrate on those martial skills necessary for their very survival, and the Romano-Britons of western Britain did offer stiffer and ultimately successful resistance. The region of Venedotia, however, had been under Roman military administration and included established Gaelic settlements, and the civilian element there was less extensive, perhaps facilitating technological loss.

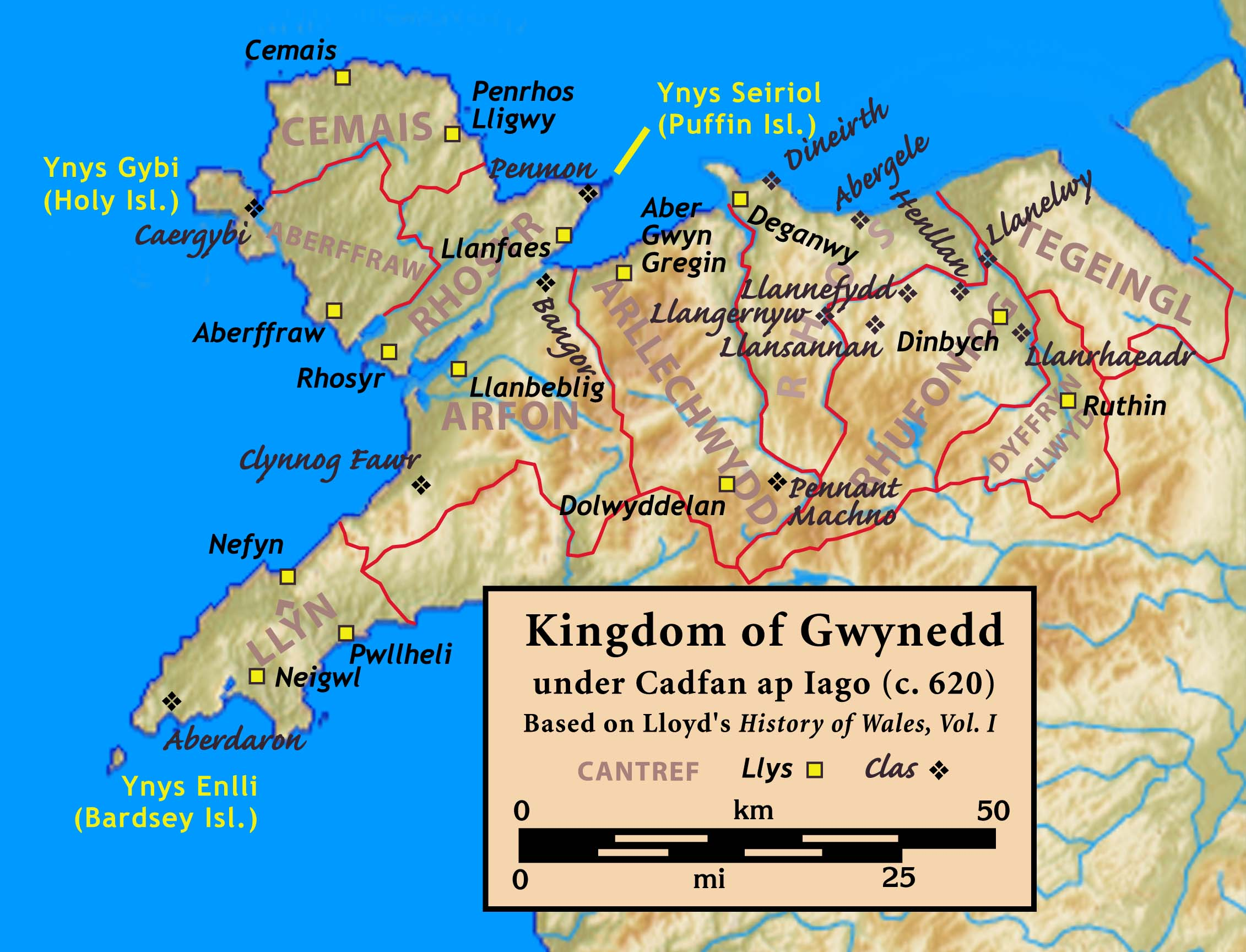
Kingdom of Gwynedd c. 620

In the post-Roman period, the earliest rulers of Wales and Gwynedd may have exerted authority over regions no larger than the cantrefi (hundreds) described in Welsh law codified centuries later, with their size somewhat comparable in size to the Irish tuath. These early petty kings or princelings (Lloyd uses the term chieftain) adopted the title rhi in Welsh (akin to the Irish Gaelic rí), later replaced by brenin, a title used to "denote a less archaic form of kingship," according to Professor John Davies. Genealogical lists compiled around 960 bear out that a number of these early rulers claimed degrees of association with the old Roman order, but do not appear in the official royal lineages. "It may be assumed that the stronger kings annexed the territories of their weaker neighbours and that the lineages of the victors are the only lineages to have survived," according to Davies. Smaller and weaker chieftains coalesced around more powerful princelings, sometimes through voluntary vassalage or inheritance, though at other times through conquest, and the lesser princelings coalesced around still greater princelings until a regional prince could claim authority over the whole of north Wales from the River Dyfi in the south to the Dee in the east, and incorporating Anglesey.

Other evidence supports Nennius's claim that a leader came to North Wales and brought the region a measure of stability although an Irish Gaelic element remained until the mid-5th century. Cunedda's heir Einion Yrth ap Cunedda defeated the remaining Gaelic Irish on Anglesey by 470, while his son, Cadwallon Lawhir ap Einion, appears to have consolidated the realm during the time of relative peace following the Battle of Badon, where the Anglo-Saxons were defeated. During that peace, he established a mighty kingdom. After Cadwallon, Gwynedd appears to have held a pre-eminent position among the petty Cambrian states in the post-Roman period. The great-grandson of Cunedda, Maelgwn Hir (Maelgwn the Tall), was regarded as an able military leader, impetuous and generous. There are several legends about his life concerning either his own trickery and craftiness or, on the other hand, miracles performed against him by Christian saints. He is attributed in some old stories as hosting the first Eisteddfod, and he is also one of five Celtic British kings castigated for their sins by the contemporary Christian writer Gildas (who referred to him as Maglocunus, meaning 'Prince-Hound' in Brittonic), written in the De Excidio et Conquestu Britanniae. Maelgwn was curiously described as "the dragon of the island" by Gildas which was possibly a title, but explicitly as the most powerful of the five named British kings. "[Y]ou the last I write of but the first and greatest in evil, more than many in ability but also in malice, more generous in giving but also more liberal in sin, strong in war but stronger to destroy your soul."

Maelgwn eventually died from the plague in 547, leaving a succession crisis in his wake. His son-in-law, Elidyr Mwynfawr of the Kingdom of Strathclyde, claimed the throne and invaded Gwynedd to displace Maelgwn's son, Rhun ap Maelgwn. Elidyr was killed in the attempt, but his death was then avenged by his relatives, who ravaged the coast of Arfon. Rhun counter-attacked and exacted the same penalty on the lands of his foes in what is now South and Central Scotland. The long distances these armies travelled suggests they were moving across the Irish Sea, but, because almost all of what is now northern England was at this point (c. 550) under Brittonic rule, it is possible that his army marched to Strathclyde overland. Rhun returned to Gwynedd, and the rest of his reign was for the majority uneventful until the relatives of Elidir renewed their aggressions against Rhun who was killed in the conflict. He was succeeded by his son or in some accounts nephew Beli ap Rhun in c. 586.

On the accession of Beli's son Iago ap Beli in c. 599, the situation in Britain had deteriorated significantly. Most of northern England had been overrun by the invading Angles of Deira and Bernicia, who were in the process of forming the Kingdom of Northumbria. In a rare show of common interest, it appears that Gwynedd and the neighbouring Kingdom of Powys acted in concert to rebuff the Anglian advance but were defeated at the Battle of Chester in 613. Following this catastrophe, the approximate borders of northern Wales were set with the city of Caerlleon (now called Chester) and the surrounding Cheshire Plain falling under the control of the Anglo-Saxons. Beli's grandson was Cadfan ap Iago from the line of Maelgwn, his tombstone in Gwynedd wrote in Latin: "Catamanus rex sapientisimus opinatisimus" (most renowned), he was an ancestor of the future Kings of Gwynedd.

=== Cadwallon ap Cadfan ===
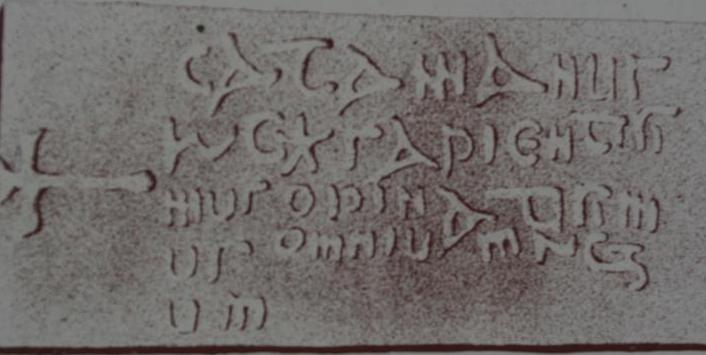
Gravestone of Cadfan ap Iago, father of Cadwallon ap Cadfan

The Battle of Chester did not end the ability of the Welsh to seriously threaten the Anglo-Saxon polities. Among the most powerful of the early kings was Cadwallon ap Cadfan (c. 624 – 634), grandson of Iago ap Beli. He became engaged in an initially disastrous campaign against Northumbria where following a series of epic defeats he was confined first to Anglesey, before being forced into exile across the Irish Sea to Dublin, – a place which would come to host many royal refugees from Gwynedd. All must have seemed lost but Cadwallon (Welsh: Meigen) raised an enormous army and after a brief time in Guernsey he invaded Dumnonia, relieved the West Welsh who were suffering a Mercian invasion and forced the pagan Penda of Mercia into an alliance against Northumbria. With new vigour Cadwallon returned to his Northumbrian foes, defeated their armies and slew a series of their kings. In this furious campaign, his armies devastated Northumbria, captured and sacked York in 633 and briefly controlled the kingdom. At this time, according to Bede, many Northumbrians were slaughtered, "with savage cruelty", by Cadwallon.

[H]e neither spared the female sex, nor the innocent age of children, but with savage cruelty put them to tormenting deaths, ravaging all their country for a long time, and resolving to cut off all the race of the English within the borders of Britain.

— Bede, Ecclesiastical History of the English People

Despite the war and 14 battles undertaken by the allied forces of Gwynedd and Mercia against Northumbria, of which the chief one was the Battle of Cefn Digoll in 632, an alliance was concluded when Cadwallon married Alcfritha, daughter of Pybba of Mercia. However, the effect of these tumultuous events would come to be short-lived, for he died in battle in 634 close to Hadrian's Wall, at the Battle of Heavenfield. On account of these deeds, he and his son Cadwaladr, (who fought at the Battle of the Winwaed) appear to have been considered the last two High Kings of Britain. Cadwaladr presided over a period of consolidation and devoted much time to the Church, earning the title "Bendigaid" for "Blessed". As a monk in later life, he was involved with Clynnog's abbey, and St Cadwaladr's Church, Llangadwaladr on Anglesey. The Tudors of Penmynydd and Henry VII of England in particular claimed descent from Cadwaladr in the "twenty-second degree". (Note: Cadwallon ap Cadfan (CÆDWALLA) was considered one of the legendary kings of Britain, like his father and his son being the final ruler from a line dating back to 1100 BC beginning with Brutus of Troy, according to Geoffrey of Monmouth and the Historia Regum Britanniae.)

=== Rhodri the Great and Aberffraw primacy ===
During the later part of the 9th and 10th centuries, the coastal areas of Gwynedd, particularly Anglesey, were coming under increasing attack by the Vikings. Wales had also been at war with the neighbouring English Kingdoms of Mercia and Wessex who were assisted by Anglo-Saxons and Danes (Vikings). But it was the kings of Welsh kingdoms who were protected by the Scandinavian York mercenaries. These raids no doubt had a seriously debilitating effect on the country but fortunately for Gwynedd, the victims of the Vikings were not confined to Wales. The House of Cunedda – as the direct descendants of Cunedda are known – eventually expired in the male line in 825 upon the death of Hywel ap Rhodri Molwynog and, as John Edward Lloyd put it, "a stranger possessed the throne of Gwynedd."

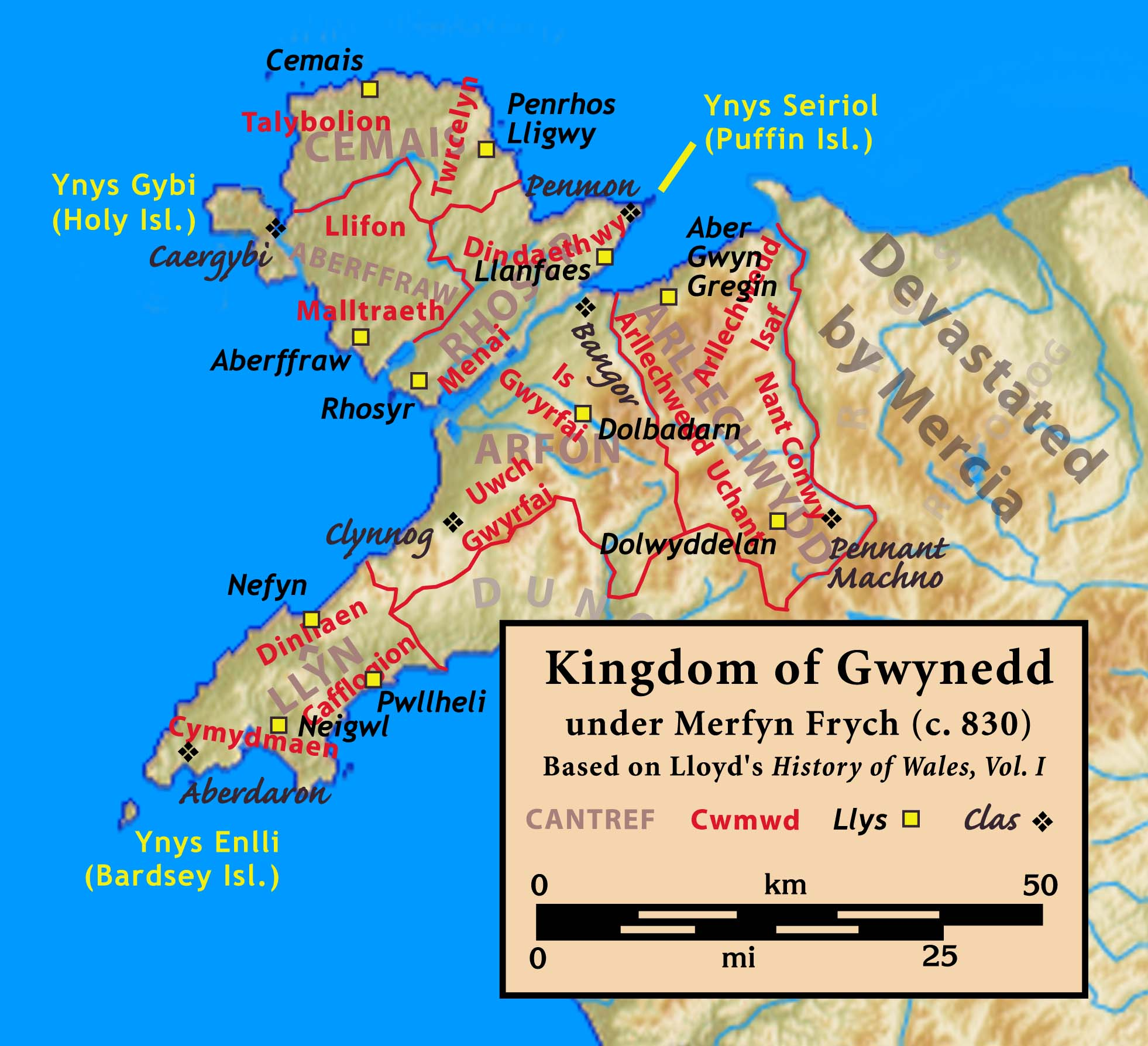
Kingdom of Gwynedd c. 830

This "stranger" who became the next King of Gwynedd was Merfyn "Frych" (Merfyn "the Freckled"). When, however, Merfyn Frych's pedigree is examined – and to the Welsh pedigree meant everything – he seems not a stranger but a direct descendant of the ancient ruling line. He was the son of Gwriad, the contemporaneous King of Mann from the Isle of Man and depending on the source either son or husband of Essyllt daughter of Cynan Dindaethwy a former King of Gwynedd. The most ancient genealogical sources agree that Merfyn was the son of Essyllt, heiress and cousin of the aforementioned Hywel ap Caradog, last of the ruling House of Cunedda in Gwynedd, and that Merfyn's male line went back to the Hen Ogledd to Llywarch Hen, a first cousin of Urien and thus a direct descendant of Coel Hen. Thus the House of Cunedda and the new House of Aberffraw, as Merfyn's descendants came to be known, shared Coel Hen as a common ancestor, although the House of Cunedda traced their line through Gwawl his daughter and wife of Cunedda.

Merfyn married Nest ferch Cadell, the sister or daughter of Cyngen ap Cadell, the King of Powys of the Gwertherion dynasty, and founded the House of Aberffraw, named after his principal court on Anglesey. No written records are preserved from the Britons of southern Scotland and northern England and it is very likely that Merfyn Frych brought many of these legends as well as his pedigree with him when he came to north Wales. It appears most probable that it was at Merfyn's court that all the lore of the north was collected and written down during his reign and that of his son.

Rhodri the Great (844–878), son of Merfyn Frych and Nest ferch Cadell, was able to add the Powys to his realm after its king (his maternal uncle) died on a pilgrimage to Rome in 855. Later, he married Angharad ferch Meurig, the sister of King Gwgon of Seisyllwg. When Gwgon drowned without an heir in 872, Rhodri became a steward over the kingdom and was able to install his son, Cadell ap Rhodri, as a subject king. Thus, he became the first ruler since the days of Cunedda to control the greater part of Wales.

When Rhodri died in 878 AD (battle against Ceolwulf I of Mercia) the relative unity of Wales ended and it was once again divided into its component parts each ruled by one of his sons. Rhodri's eldest son Anarawd ap Rhodri inherited Gwynedd and would firmly establish the princely House of Aberffraw. His son Merfyn ap Rhodri was given the Kingdom of Powys to rule and Cadell founded the medieval Welsh Royal House of Dinefwr in Deheubarth, this divided Wales into North Wales, Mid Wales and South Wales respectively. Gwynedd and the Aberffraw dynasty thrived with but a few interruptions until 1283.

From the successes of Rhodri and the seniority of Anarawd among his sons the Aberffraw family claimed primacy over all other Welsh lords including the powerful kings of Powys and Deheubarth. (Note: Recovers Gwynedd, Norman invasion, Battle of Anglesey Sound, pp. 21–22, 36, 39, 40, later years 76–77) In The History of Gruffudd ap Cynan, written in the late 12th century, the family asserted its rights as the senior line of descendants from Rhodri the Great who had conquered most of Wales during his lifetime. Gruffudd ap Cynan's biography was first written in Latin and intended for a wider audience outside Wales. The significance of this claim was that the Aberffraw family owed nothing to the English king for its position in Wales and that they held authority in Wales "by absolute right through descent," wrote historian John Davies.

The House of Aberffraw was displaced in 942 by Hywel Dda, a King of Deheubarth from a junior line of descent from Rhodri Mawr. This occurred because Idwal Foel, the King of Gwynedd, was determined to cast off English overlordship and took up arms against the new English king, Edmund I. Idwal and his brother Elisedd were both killed in battle against Edmund's forces. By normal custom Idwal's crown should have passed to his sons, Ieuaf and Iago ab Idwal, but Hywel Dda intervened and sent Iago and Ieuaf into exile in Ireland and established himself as ruler over Gwynedd until his death in 950 when the House of Aberffraw was restored. Nonetheless, surviving manuscripts of Cyfraith Hywel recognise the importance of the lords of Aberffraw as overlords of Wales along with the rulers of Deheubarth. (Note: Of the three surviving groups of manuscripts of the Cyfraith Hywel (all dating from the 12th century or later), one group recognises Gwynedd exclusively, another Deheubarth exclusively, and the last both together. See Wade-Evans, A.W. Welsh Medieval Law. "Introduction". Oxford Univ., 1909. Retrieved 30 January 2013.)

Between 986 and 1081 the throne of Gwynedd was often in contention with the rightful kings frequently displaced by rivals within and outside the realm. One of these, Gruffudd ap Llywelyn, originally from Powys, displaced the Aberffraw line from Gwynedd making himself ruler there, and by 1055 was able to make himself king of most of Wales. He became powerful enough to present a real menace to England and annexed some neighbouring parts after several victories over English armies. Eventually, he was defeated by Harold Godwinson in 1063 and later killed by his own men in a deal to secure peace with England. Bleddyn ap Cynfyn and his brother Rhiwallon of the Mathrafal dynasty of Powys, Gruffudd's maternal half-brothers, came to terms with Harold and took over the rule of Gwynedd and Powys.

Shortly after the Norman Conquest of England in 1066 the Normans began to exert pressure on the eastern border of Gwynedd. They were helped by internal strife following the killing of Bleddyn ap Cynfyn in 1075 by his second cousin Rhys ap Owain King of Deheubarth. Another relative of Bleddyn's Trahaearn ap Caradog seized the throne but was soon challenged by Gruffudd ap Cynan, the exiled grandson of Iago ab Idwal ap Meurig who had been living in the Norse–Gael stronghold of Dublin. In 1081 Trahaearn was killed by Gruffudd in battle and the ancient line of Rhodri Mawr was restored.

== Gwynedd in the High Middle Ages ==
=== Gruffudd ap Cynan ===
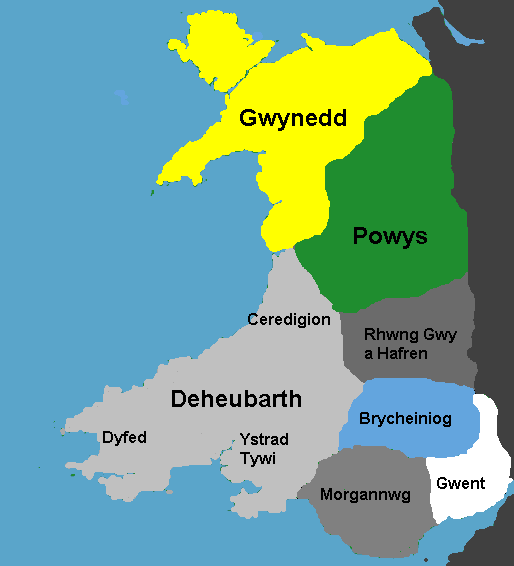
Wales c. 1063 – 1081

The Aberffraw dynasty suffered various depositions by rivals in Deheubarth, Powys, and England in the 10th and 11th centuries. Gruffudd ap Cynan (c. 1055–1137), who grew up in exile in Norse–Gael Dublin, regained his inheritance following his victory at the Battle of Mynydd Carn in 1081 over his Mathrafal rivals then in control of Gwynedd. However, Gruffudd's victory was short-lived as the Normans launched an invasion of Wales following the Saxon revolt in northern England, known as the Harrowing of the North.

Shortly after the Battle of Mynydd Carn in 1081, Gruffudd was lured into a trap with the promise of an alliance but seized by Hugh d'Avranches, Earl of Chester, in an ambush near Corwen. Earl Hugh claimed the Perfeddwlad up to the River Clwyd (the commotes of Tegeingl and Rhufoniog; the modern counties of Denbighshire, Flintshire, and Wrexham) as part of Chester, and viewed the restoration of the Aberffraw family in Gwynedd as a threat to his own expansion into Wales. The lands west of the Clwyd were intended for his cousin Robert of Rhuddlan, and their advance extended to the Llŷn Peninsula by 1090. By 1094 almost the whole of Wales was occupied by Norman forces. However, although they erected many castles, Norman control in most regions of Wales was tenuous at best. Motivated by local anger over the "gratuitously cruel" invaders, and led by the historic ruling houses, Welsh control over the greater part of Wales was restored by 1100.

In an effort to further consolidate his control over Gwynedd, Earl Hugh of Chester had Hervey le Breton elected as Bishop of Bangor in 1092, and consecrated by Thomas of Bayeux, Archbishop of York. (Note: It was hoped that placing a prelate loyal to the Normans over the traditionally independent Welsh church in Gwynedd would help to pacify the local inhabitants, and Hervé recognised the primacy of the Archbishop of Canterbury over the episcopal see of Bangor, a recognition hitherto rejected by the Welsh church.) However, the Welsh parishioners remained hostile to Hervey's appointment, and the bishop was forced to carry a sword with him and rely on a contingent of Norman knights for his protection. Additionally, Hervey routinely excommunicated parishioners who he perceived as challenging his spiritual and temporal authority.

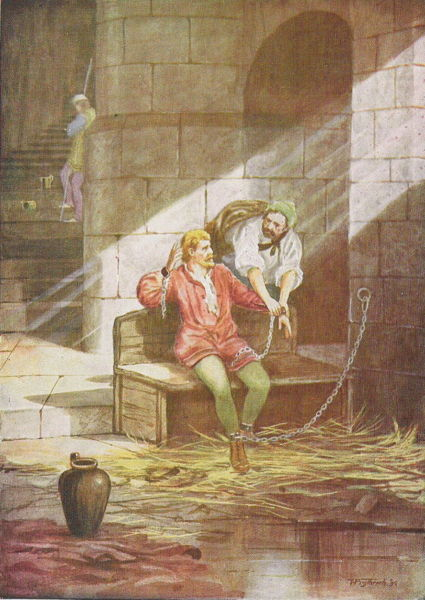
Gruffudd ap Cynan escapes from Chester. Illustration by T. Prytherch in 1900

Gruffudd escaped imprisonment in Chester and slew Robert of Rhuddlan in a beachside battle at Deganwy on 3 July 1093. Gruffudd recovered Gwynedd by 1095, and by 1098 Gruffudd allied with Cadwgan ap Bleddyn of the Mathrafal house of Powys, their traditional dynastic rivalry notwithstanding. Gruffudd and Cadwgan led the Welsh resistance to the Norman occupation in the north and mid-Wales. However, by 1098 Earl Hugh of Chester and Hugh of Montgomery, 2nd Earl of Shrewsbury advanced their army to the Menai Strait, with Gruffudd and Cadwgan regrouping on defensible Anglesey, where they planned to make retaliatory strikes from their island fortress. Gruffudd hired a Norse fleet from a settlement in Ireland to patrol the Menai and prevent the Norman army from crossing; however, the Normans were able to pay off the fleet to instead ferry them to Môn. Betrayed, Gruffudd and Cadwgan were forced to flee to Ireland in a skiff.

The Normans landed on Anglesey, and their furious 'victory celebrations' which followed were exceptionally violent, with rape and carnage committed by the Norman army left unchecked. The earl of Shrewsbury had an elderly priest mutilated and made the church of Llandyfrydog a kennel for his dogs.

During the 'celebrations' a Norse fleet led by Magnus Barefoot, King of Norway, (Note: Mentioned in the Magnus Barefoot saga.) appeared off the coast at Puffin Island, and in the battle that followed, known as the Battle of Anglesey Sound, Magnus shot dead the earl of Shrewsbury with an arrow to the eye. The Norse left as suddenly and as mysteriously as they had arrived, leaving the Norman army weakened and demoralized.

The Norman army retired to England, leaving a Welshman, Owain ab Edwin of Tegeingl, in command of a token force to control Ynys Môn (now Anglesey) and upper Gwynedd, and ultimately abandoning any colonisation plans there. Owain ap Edwin transferred his allegiance to Chester following the defeat of his ally Trahaearn ap Caradog in 1081, a move which earned him the epithet Bradwr "the Traitor" (Welsh: Owain Fradwr), among the Welsh.

In late 1098 Gruffudd and Cadwgan landed in Wales and recovered Anglesey without much difficulty, with Hervé the Breton fleeing Bangor for safety in England. Over the course of the next three years, Gruffudd was able to recover upper Gwynedd to the Conwy, defeating Hugh, Earl of Chester. In 1101, after Earl Hugh's death, Gruffudd and Cadwgan came to terms with England's new king, Henry I, who was consolidating his own authority and also eager to come to terms. In the negotiations which followed Henry I recognised Gruffudd's ancestral claims of Anglesey, Llŷn, Dunoding (Eifionydd and Ardudwy) and Arllechwedd, being the lands of upper Gwynedd to the Conwy which were already firmly in Gruffudd's control. Cadwgan regained Ceredigion, and his share of the family inheritance in Powys, from the new earl of Shrewsbury, Robert of Bellême.

With the settlement reached between Henry I and Gruffudd, and other Welsh lords, the dividing of Wales between Pura Wallia, the lands under Welsh control; and Marchia Wallie, Welsh lands under Norman control, came into existence. Author and historian John Davies notes that the border shifted on occasion, "in one direction and in the other", but remained more or less stable for almost the next two hundred years.

After generations of incessant warfare, Gruffudd began the reconstruction of Gwynedd, intent on bringing stability to his country. According to Davies, Gruffudd sought to give his people the peace to "plant their crops in the full confidence that they would be able to harvest them". Gruffudd consolidated royal authority in north Wales, and offered sanctuary to displaced Welsh from the Perfeddwlad, particularly from Rhos, at the time harassed by Richard, 2nd Earl of Chester.

Alarmed by Gruffudd's growing influence and authority in north Wales, and on pretext that Gruffudd sheltered rebels from Rhos against Chester, Henry I launched a campaign against Gwynedd and Powys in 1116, which included a vanguard commanded by King Alexander I of Scotland. While Owain ap Cadwgan of Ceredigion sought refuge in Gwynedd's mountains, Maredudd ap Bleddyn of Powys made peace with the English king as the Norman army advanced. There were no battles or skirmishes fought in the face of the vast host brought into Wales; rather, Owain and Gruffudd entered into truce negotiations. Owain ap Cadwgan regained royal favour relatively easily. However, Gruffudd was forced to render homage and fealty and pay a heavy fine, though he lost no land or prestige.

The invasion left a lasting impact on Gruffudd, who by 1116 was in his 60s and with failing eyesight. For the remainder of his life, while Gruffudd continued to rule in Gwynedd, his sons Cadwallon, Owain, and Cadwaladr, lead Gwynedd's army after 1120. Gruffudd's policy, which his sons would execute and later rulers of Gwynedd adopted, was to recover Gwynedd's primacy without blatantly antagonising the English crown.

==== The expansion of Gwynedd ====
In 1120 a minor border war between Llywarch ab Owain, lord of a commote in the Dyffryn Clwyd cantref, and Hywel ab Ithel, lord of Rhufoniog and Rhos, brought Powys and Chester into conflict in the Perfeddwlad. Powys brought a force of 400 warriors to the aid of its ally Rhufoniog, while Chester sent Norman knights from Rhuddlan to the aid of Dyffryn Clwyd. The bloody Battle of Maes Maen Cymro, fought 1 mile (1.5 kilometres) northwest of Ruthin, ended with Llywarch ab Owain slain and the defeat of Dyffryn Clwyd. However, it was a pyrrhic victory as the battle left Hywel ab Ithel mortally wounded. In the last of his line, when Hywel ab Ithel died six weeks later, he left Rhufoniog and Rhos bereft. Powys, however, was not strong enough to garrison Rhufoniog and Rhos, nor was Chester able to exert influence inland from its coastal holdings of Rhuddlan and Degannwy. With Rhufoniog and Rhos abandoned, Gruffudd annexed the cantrefs.

On the death of Einion ap Cadwgan, lord of Meirionnydd, a quarrel engulfed his kinsmen on who should succeed him. Meirionnydd was then a vassal cantref of Powys, and the family there a cadet of the Mathrafal house of Powys. Gruffudd gave licence to his sons Cadwallon and Owain to press the opportunity the dynastic strife in Meirionnydd presented. The brothers raided Meirionnydd with the Lord of Powys as important there as he was in the Perfeddwlad. However, it would not be until 1136 that the cantref was firmly within Gwynedd's control. Perhaps because of their support of Earl Hugh of Chester, Gwynedd's rival, in 1124, Cadwallon slew the three rulers of Dyffryn Clwyd, his maternal uncles, bringing the cantref firmly under Gwynedd's vassalage that year. And in 1125 Cadwallon slew the grandsons of Edwin ap Goronwy of Tegeingl, leaving Tegeingl bereft of lordship. However, in 1132 while on campaign in the commote of Nanheudwy, near Llangollen, 'victorious' Cadwallon was defeated in battle and slain by an army from Powys. The defeat checked Gwynedd's expansion for a time, "much to the relief of the men of Powys", wrote historian Sir John Edward Lloyd (J.E Lloyd).

In 1136 a campaign against the Normans was launched from Gwynedd in revenge for the execution of Gwenllian ferch Gruffudd ap Cynan, the wife of the King of Deheubarth and the daughter of Gruffudd. When word reached Gwynedd of Gwenllian's death and the revolt in Gwent, Gruffudd's sons Owain and Cadwaladr invaded Norman-controlled Ceredigion, taking Llanfihangle, Aberystwyth, and Llanbadarn. Liberating Llanbadarn, one local chronicler hailed Owain and Cadwaladr both as "bold lions, virtuous, fearless and wise, who guard the churches and their indwellers, defenders of the poor [who] overcome their enemies, affording a safest retreat to all those who seek their protection". The brothers restored the Welsh monks of Llanbadarn, who had been displaced by monks from Gloucester brought there by the Normans who had controlled Ceredigion. By late September 1136, a vast Welsh host gathered in Ceredigion, which included the combined forces of Gwynedd, Deheubarth, and Powys, and met the Norman army at the Battle of Crug Mawr at Cardigan Castle. The battle turned into a rout, and then into a resounding defeat of the Normans.

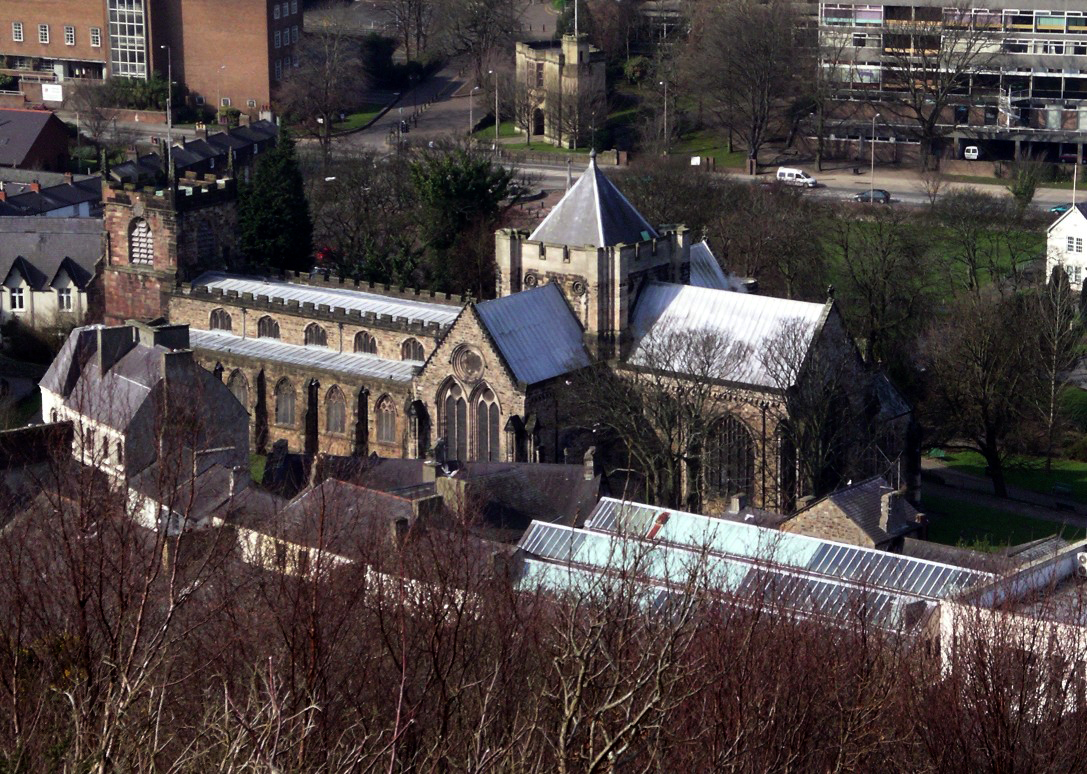
Gruffudd's remains were interred in a tomb in the presbytery of Bangor Cathedral

When their father Gruffudd died in 1137, the brothers Owain and Cadwaladr were on a second campaign in Ceredigion and took the castles of Ystrad Meurig, Lampeter (Stephen's Castle), and Castell Hywell (Humphries Castle) Gruffudd ap Cynan left a more stable realm than had hitherto existed in Gwynedd for more than 100 years. No foreign army was able to cross the Conwy into upper Gwynedd. The stability of Gruffudd's long reign allowed Gwynedd's Welsh to plan for the future without fear that home and harvest would "go to the flames" from invaders.

Settlements became more permanent, with buildings of stone replacing timber structures. Stone churches, in particular, were built across Gwynedd, with so many limewashed that "Gwynedd was bespangled with them as is the firmament with stars". Gruffudd had built stone churches at his royal manors, and Lloyd suggests Gruffudd's example led to the rebuilding of churches with stone in Penmon, Aberdaron, and Towyn in the Norman fashion.

Gruffudd promoted the primacy of the Episcopal See of Bangor in Gwynedd, and funded the building of Bangor Cathedral during the episcopate of David the Scot, Bishop of Bangor, between 1120 and 1139. Gruffudd's remains were interred in a tomb in the presbytery of Bangor Cathedral.

=== Owain Gwynedd ===
Owain ap Gruffudd (Owain Gwynedd c. 1100 – 23 or 28 November 1170) succeeded his father to the greater portion of Gwynedd in accordance with Welsh law, the Cyfraith Hywel, the Laws of Hywel; and became known as Owain Gwynedd to differentiate him from another Owain ap Gruffudd, the Mathrafal ruler of Powys, known as Owain Cyfeiliog. Cadwaladr, Gruffudd's youngest son, inherited the commote of Aberffraw on Ynys Môn (now Anglesey), and the recently conquered Meirionydd and northern Ceredigion--i.e., Ceredigion between the rivers Aeron and the Dyfi.

By 1141 Cadwaladr and Madog ap Maredudd of Powys led a Welsh vanguard as an ally of the Earl of Chester in the Battle of Lincoln, and joined in the rout which made Stephen of England a prisoner of Empress Matilda for a year Owain, however, did not participate in the battle, keeping the majority of Gwynedd's army at home. (Note: Speculation about Owain might have shown him of restrained and prudent temperament, may have judged that aiding in Stephen's capture would lead to the restoration of Matilda and a strong royal government in England, a government which would support Marcher lords—support hitherto lacking since Stephen's usurpation.)

Owain and Cadwaladr came to blows in 1143 when Cadwaladr was implicated in the murder of King Anarawd ap Gruffudd of Deheubarth, Owain's ally and future son-in-law, on the eve of Anarawd's wedding to Owain's daughter. Owain followed a diplomatic policy of binding other Welsh rulers to Gwynedd through dynastic marriages, and Cadwaladr's border dispute and murder of Anarawd threatened Owain's efforts and credibility. As ruler of Gwynedd, Owain stripped Cadwaladr of his lands, with Owain's son Hywel dispatched to Ceredigion, where he burned Cadwaladr's castle at Aberystwyth. Cadwaladr fled to Ireland and hired a Norse fleet from Dublin, bringing the fleet to Abermenai to compel Owain to reinstate him. This same fleet of ships would be considered a sizeable one to be able to face the fleet of Stephen, King of England, as well as The Irish and Scottish at Abermenai Point prior in 1142. Taking advantage of the brotherly strife, and perhaps with the tacit understanding of Cadwaladr, the marcher lords mounted incursions into Wales. Realizing the wider ramifications of the war before him, Owain and Cadwaladr came to terms and reconciled, with Cadwaladr restored to his lands. Peace between the brothers held until 1147, when an unrecorded event occurred which led Owain's sons Hywel and Cynan to drive Cadwaladr out of Meirionydd and Ceredigion, with Cadwaladr retreating to Môn. Again an accord was reached, with Cadwaladr retaining Aberffraw until a more serious breach occurred in 1153 when he was forced into exile in England, where his wife was the sister of Gilbert de Clare, 1st Earl of Hertford and the niece of Ranulf de Gernon, 4th Earl of Chester.

In 1146 news reached Owain that his favoured eldest son and heir, Rhun ab Owain Gwynedd, died. Owain was overcome with grief, falling into a deep depression from which none could console him until news reached him that Mold Castle in Tegeingl had fallen to Gwynedd, "[reminding Owain] that he had still a country for which to live," wrote historian Sir John Edward Lloyd.

Between 1148 and 1151, Owain I of Gwynedd fought against Madog ap Maredudd of Powys, Owain's son-in-law, and against the Earl of Chester for control of Iâl (Yale), with Owain having secured Rhuddlan Castle and all of Tegeingl from Chester. "By 1154 Owain had brought his men within sight of the red towers of the great city on the Dee", wrote Lloyd."

Having spent three years consolidating his authority in the vast Angevin Empire, Henry II of England resolved on a strategy against Owain I of Gwynedd by 1157. By now, Owain's enemies had joined Henry II's camp, enemies such as his wayward brother Cadwaladr and in particular the support of Madog of Powys. (Note: Lloyd 2004 book, Owain and Henry II page, 99. 1070.) Henry II raised his feudal host and marched into Wales from Chester. Owain positioned himself and his army at Dinas Basing (Basingwerk), barring the road to Rhuddlan, setting up a trap in which Henry II would send his army along the direct road on the coast, while he crossed through the woods to out-flank Owain. The King of Gwynedd anticipated this, and dispatched his sons Dafydd ab Owain Gwynedd and Cynan into the woods with an army, catching Henry II unaware.

In the melee which followed Henry II might have been slain had not Roger de Clare, 2nd Earl of Hertford, rescued the king. Henry II retreated and made his way back to his main army, by now slowly advancing towards Rhuddlan. Not wishing to engage the Norman army directly, Owain repositioned himself first at St. Asaph, then further west, clearing the road for Henry II to enter into Rhuddlan "ingloriously". Once in Rhuddlan Henry II received word that his naval expedition had failed, as instead of meeting Henry II at Degannwy or Rhuddlan, it had gone to plunder Anglesey, this resulted in the Battle of Ewloe, and has since been commemorated with a plaque 850 years after the battle of 1157, during 2007.

In a later letter to the Byzantine emperor, Henry probably recalled these experiences when he wrote, "A people called Welsh, so bold and ferocious that, when unarmed, they do not fear to encounter an armed force, being ready to shed their blood in defence of their country, and to sacrifice their lives for renown."

The naval expedition was led by Henry II's maternal uncle (Empress Matilda's half-brother), Henry FitzRoy; and when they landed on Môn, Henry FitzRoy had the churches of Llanbedr Goch and Llanfair Mathafarn Eithaf torched. During the night the men of Môn gathered together, and the next morning fought and defeated the Norman army, with Henry FitzRoy falling under a shower of lances. The defeat of his navy and his own military difficulties had convinced Henry II that he had "gone as far as was practical that year" in his effort to subject Owain, and the King offered terms.

Owain I of Gwynedd, "ever prudent and sagacious", recognised that he needed time to further consolidate power, and agreed to the terms. Owain was to render homage and fealty to the King, and resign Tegeingl and Rhuddlan to Chester, and restore Cadwaladr to his possessions in Gwynedd.

The death of Madog ap Meredudd of Powys in 1160 opened an opportunity for Owain I of Gwynedd to further press Gwynedd's influence at the expense of Powys. (Note: Owain 1160–1170, Lloyd 2004 Book) However, Owain continued to further Gwynedd's expansion without rousing the English crown, maintaining his 'prudent policy' of Quieta non-movere (translated from Latin – do not move settled things). (Note: Quoting what Lloyd wrote, 2004.) It was a policy of outward conciliation while masking his own consolidation of authority. To further demonstrate his goodwill, in 1160 Owain handed over to the English crown the fugitive Einion Clud. By 1162 Owain was in possession of the Powys cantref of Cyfeiliog, and its castle, Tafolwern; and ravaged another Powys cantref, Arwystli, slaying its lord, Hywel ab Ieuaf. Owain's strategy was in sharp contrast to Rhys ap Gruffudd, King of Deheubarth, who in 1162 rose in open revolt against the Normans in south Wales, drawing Henry II back to England from the continent.

In 1163 Henry II quarrelled with Thomas Becket, the Archbishop of Canterbury, causing growing divisions between the king's supporters and the archbishop's supporters. With discontent mounting in England, Owain of Gwynedd joined with Rhys ap Gruffudd of Deheubarth in a second grand Welsh revolt against Henry II. England's king, who only the prior year had pardoned Rhys ap Gruffudd for his 1162 revolt, assembled a vast host against the allied Welsh, with troops drawn from all over the Angevin empire assembling in Shrewsbury, and with the Norse of Dublin paid to harass the Welsh coast. While his army gathered on the Welsh frontier, Henry II left for the continent to negotiate a truce with France and Flanders to not disturb his peace while campaigning in Wales.

However, when Henry II returned to England he found that the war had already begun, with Owain's son Dafydd raiding Angevin positions in Tegeingl, exposing the castles of Rhuddlan and Basingwerk to "serious dangers", wrote Lloyd. Henry II rushed to north Wales for a few days to shore up defences there, before returning to his main army now gathering in Oswestry.

The vast host gathered before the allied Welsh principalities represented the largest army yet assembled for their conquest, a circumstance which further drew the Welsh allies into a closer confederacy, wrote Lloyd. With Owain I of Gwynedd the overall battle commander, and with his brother Cadwaladr as his second, Owain assembled the Welsh host at Corwen in the vale of Edeyrion where he could best resist Henry II's advance.

The Angevin army advanced from Oswestry into Wales crossing the mountains towards Mur Castell and found itself in the thick forest of the Ceiriog Valley where they were forced into a narrow thin line. Owain I had positioned a band of skirmishers in the thick woods overlooking the pass, which harassed the exposed army from a secured position. Henry II ordered the clearing of the woods on either side to widen the passage through the valley and to lessen the exposure of his army. The road his army travelled later became known as the Ffordd y Saeson, the English Road, and leads through heath and bog towards the Dee. In a dry summer the moors may have been passable, but "on this occasion the skies put on their most wintry aspect; and the rain fell in torrents [...] flooding the mountain meadows" until the great Angevin encampment became a "morass," wrote Lloyd. In the face of "hurricane" force of wind and rain, diminishing provisions and an exposed supply line stretching through a hostile country subject to enemy raids, and with a demoralised army, Henry II was forced into a complete retreat without even a semblance of a victory.

In frustration, Henry II had twenty-two Welsh hostages mutilated; the sons of Owain's supporters and allies, including two of Owain's own sons. In addition to his failed campaign in Wales, Henry's mercenary Norse navy, which he had hired to harass the Welsh coast, turned out to be too few for use and were disbanded without engagement.

Henry II's Welsh campaign was a complete failure, with the king abandoning all plans for the conquest of Wales, returning to his court in Anjou and not returning to England for another four years. Lloyd wrote:

It is true that [Henry II] did not cross swords with [Owain I], but the elements had done their work for [the Welsh]; the stars in their courses had fought against the pride of England and humbled it to the very dust. To conquer a land which was defended, not merely by the arms of its valiant and audacious sons, but also by tangled woods and impassable bogs, by piercing winds and pitiless storms of rain, seemed a hopeless task, and Henry resolved to no longer attempt it.

Owain expanded his international diplomatic offensive against Henry II by sending an embassy to Louis VII of France in 1168, led by Arthur of Bardsey, Bishop of Bangor (1166–1177), who was charged with negotiating a joint alliance against Henry II. With Henry II distracted by his widening quarrel with Thomas Becket, Owain's army recovered Tegeingl for Gwynedd by 1169.

Lloyd quotes: "The praises so repeatedly accorded to his many personal qualities by contemporary poets, and indeed by several public figures who could not have been predisposed in his favour, have so genuine a tone about them that the progressive trends in all the arts of peace and war discerned in 12th century Wales, it must be concluded, were in large measure due to the fostering genius of ' Owain the Great.'"

In his later reign Owain I was styled princeps Wallensium, Latin for the Prince of the Welsh, a title of substance given his leadership of the Welsh and victory against the English king, wrote historian Dr. John Davies. Additionally, Owain commissioned the Life of Gruffudd ap Cynan, the biography of his father in which Owain firmly asserted his primacy over other Welsh rulers by "absolute right through descent" from Rhodri the Great, according to Davies.

The adoption of the title prince (Latin princeps, Welsh tywysog), rather than the king (Latin rex, Welsh brenin), did not mean a diminution in status, according to Davies. The use of the title prince was a recognition of the ruler of Gwynedd in relation to the wider international feudal world. The princes of Gwynedd exercised greater status and prestige than the earls, counts, and dukes of the Angevin empire, suggesting a similar status as that of the King of Scots, himself nominally a vassal of the King of England, argued Davies. As Welsh society became further influenced by feudal Europe, the princes of Gwynedd would in turn use feudalism to strengthen their own authority over lesser Welsh lords, a "two-edged sword" for the King of England, wrote Davies. Though Gwynedd's princes recognised the de jure suzerainty of the King of England, there remained well-established Welsh law separate from English law, and were independent de facto, wrote Davies. (Note: emerging de facto statehood p. 148)

==== Civil war, usurpation 1170 – 1195, and the Prince of Wales ====
Welsh manuscripts and Annals state the events which unfolded during the end of the 12th century. This story of the Royal court of Gwynedd suffering an uprising stems from the Norman invasion of Wales a century prior to the civil strife of Owain Gwynedd and his immediate family. The internal wranglings for the crown of Gwynedd began with two sons, Rhun ab Owain Gwynedd and Hywel ab Owain Gwynedd, who were illegitimate, by Owain's Irish wife Pyfog. Owain and his father, Gruffudd ap Cynan, both had a Norse-Irish connection in their immediate family and would have used this allegiance to their advantage, especially Gruffudd who hired and army fleets of ships to invade North Wales himself. (Note: It is, therefore, possible that Owain hoped to maintain this Irish connection by ensuring the succession of one of his sons born of this Irish woman, Pyfog. Furthermore, it seems illogical – given the fact Owain was so set on their succession and the respect he no doubt commanded in Ireland – that the mother of Rhun and Hywel was a mere commoner and that both those children were born out of wedlock.) In 1146, Hywel and Cadell ap Gruffydd of Deheubarth had combined their forces to battle against invading Normans who had built castles in west Wales, they took Carmarthen, Llanstephan, and Wiston castles. (Note: What the annals record, is that in 1146 the eldest son and designated heir, Rhun – a man who was acclaimed as a great warrior and the "flower of Celtic chivalry", according to J.E. Lloyd,- "died" mysteriously, and that Hywel, his natural brother, was proclaimed the new edling, or heir.)

Hywel ab Owain Gwynedd duly succeeded his father for a short-lived term during 1170. Due to the Norman invasion of Wales, the realm was in civil war, (Note: and the internal strife appears to have been conflict between two rival factions: a pro-Irish 'legitimists' faction seeking to ensure the succession of Hywel and protect the legacy of Owain Gwynedd and his father, and a second distinctly anti-Irish coalition headed by Owain's widow.) Princess-Dowager (wife of Owain Gwynedd) Cristin verch Goronwy who promoted her own son Dafydd ab Owain Gwynedd (Dafydd I/ David I) as Prince of Gwynedd ahead of Hywel and any other senior son of Owain Gwynedd. Dafydd I made his move, and within a few months of his succession, Hywel was overthrown and killed at the Battle of Pentraeth in 1171.

Due to splinter factions, the Kingdom's royal family began to move away from Gwynedd, it is Maelgwn ab Owain Gwynedd (died after 1174 strife) who appeared to have gained Anglesey, whilst the sons of Cynan held the cantrefs of Meirionnydd, Eifionydd and Ardudwy between them . (Note: However little information is available on these occurrences, and the divisions are vaguely unclear) Dayfdd I was of Welsh royal stock, although his parents' union wasn't recognised by the church, and he was deemed illegitimate (his parents Owain and Cristin were first cousins), he would still marry royalty, his wife being the half sister of Henry II. As a Prince, he made the most of his position as a son of Owain Gwynedd, and it was Dafydd I who waged a war on his brothers when he won the Crown at the battle of Pentraeth. Dafydd I, King of Gwynedd was his title, and his merciless rule continued when he used his powers to harass his brothers into leaving Gwynedd, at one stage in 1173 Dafydd I imprisoned all of his siblings except for Madoc and Maelgwn. It was Madoc (also known as Madog ab Owain Gwynedd) who after his father's death is claimed to have set sail across the Atlantic Ocean and discovered America. (Note: The myth of transatlantic travel, pre Columbus era has been questioned yet rebuffed for centuries.) After 3 years of Maelgwn possessing Anglesey he jailed him too. Eventually, Dafydd I was himself imprisoned by the future Prince of Wales Llywelyn the Great, that was after losing the Battle of Aberconwy against an alliance of Rhodri ab Owain, and the sons of Cynan ab Owain Gwynedd. (Note: Dafydd appears to have been recognised as pre-eminent amongst them and was regarded in some way as the overall leader.)

The following year he expelled all his remaining family rivals and made himself master of all Gwynedd and in 1175, Dafydd I imprisoned his brother Rhodri. During a revolt in 1173, Dafydd I adhered to Henry II as an ally, and it was agreed that Dafydd I would marry Emma of Anjou, who was Henry's half-sister, and would receive the manor of Ellesmere as dowry.

All this was done, as the Brut y Tywysogion explained, "because [Dafydd] thought he could hold his territory in peace thereby", but it proved insufficient. Before the end of 1175 Rhodri had escaped from captivity and gathered sufficient support to drive Dafydd I from the Royal household of Aberffraw, there appears to be no activity from Dafydd I for almost 20 years after 1175, until then the final battle at Aberconwy in 1197. Dafydd I may not have inherited the leadership abilities of his father but he had sufficient diplomatic qualities remaining to ensure he could live at peace with his neighbours. This appears to be the one quality recognised by his contemporaries as he was described by Giraldus Cambrensis as a man who showed "good faith and credit by observing a strict neutrality between the Welsh and English".

His brother Rhodri had a more eventful time and fell out with the descendants of Cynan. They acted against Rhodri in 1190 and drove him out of Gwynedd altogether. Rhodri fled to the safety of the Isle of Man only to be briefly reinstated in 1193 with the assistance of Rǫgnvaldr Guðrøðarson, King of the Isles, and then driven out once more at the beginning of 1194, sharing the humiliation of his brother Dafydd ab Owain.

Dafydd Ist had a nemesis in his nephew Llywelyn ap Iorwerth, who was born most likely in the year 1173 and therefore only a child when all these events played out. Llywelyn's father Iorwerth Drwyndwn had been involved in the early stages of the dynastic struggles and most likely died sometime around 1174, during the same time as the usurpation of Dafydd I. As the century drew to a close Llywelyn became a young man and decided to stake his claim to power in Gwynedd. He conspired with his cousins Gruffudd and Maredudd and his uncle Rhodri and in the year 1194 they all united against Dafydd I. Llywelyn fought battles throughout Wales, giving him the moniker 'The great' as his ancestor Owain Gwynedd had attained. Having made alliances in his birth county of Powys and the county of the origins of his family Gwynedd, in north Wales, the stage was set for Llywelyn to dominate in battle and make alliances with the Crown of England, similar to his predecessor Dafydd I. Llywelyn married Joan, Lady of Wales, the daughter of John, King of England.

== Prince of Wales (de facto) ==
=== Llywelyn I, the Great ===
Llywelyn ab Iorwerth (1173 – 11 April 1240), later known as Llywelyn the Great (Llywelyn I), was sole ruler of Gwynedd by 1200, and made a treaty with King John of England the same year. Llywelyn's relations with John remained good for the next ten years. He married John's illegitimate daughter Joan, also known as Joanna, in 1205, and when John arrested Gwenwynwyn ab Owain of Powys in 1208 Llywelyn took the opportunity to annex southern Powys, Ceredigion and also he also rebuilt Aberystwyth Castle after razing it. In 1210 relations deteriorated and John invaded Gwynedd in 1211. Llywelyn was forced to seek terms and to give up all his lands east of the River Conwy, but was able to recover these lands the following year in alliance with the other Welsh princes. He later allied himself with the barons who forced John to sign Magna Carta in 1215. By 1216 he was the dominant power in Wales, holding a council at Aberdyfi that year to apportion lands to the other princes. Llywelyn concluded the Treaty of Worcester with the next King of England, Henry III in 1218. The treaty formally recognised Llywelyn I as Prince of Wales.

During 1220 – 1230, Llywelyn bolstered his claim to the Kingship of Gwynedd by reinforcing his borders with castles being built around the Kingdom of Gwynedd, Criccieth, Deganwy, Dolbadarn, Dolwyddelan and Castell y Bere are among the best examples. The Peace of Middle treaty in 1234 marked the beginning of the end of his military exploits and virtually established peace for the rest of Llywelyn's life. Having been on terms with his neighbouring compatriots, Llywelyn had taken to his wife's style of fashioning royal court similar to that of the English Crown and also the same rules of court devised in 914 at the Aberffraw palace. The Prince convened a court with 35 household members, and 12 Royal mounted guards. In 1317, the llys was dismantled after 4 centuries and the wood taken to Caernarfon castle for repairs. The Royal palace consisted of positions similar to Royal Households of the United Kingdom used today in England.

Llywelyn followed the laws of Hywel Dda and attempted a succession process using the Welsh gavelkind custom of choosing an heir. Llywelyn promoted his younger son Dafydd II, and according to Hubert Lewis he customised the process of designating an heir to his own fruition by giving his eldest son Gruffudd lands to rule. Dafydd II was named heir with the support of King Henry III of England, during 1238 a Welsh Royal council of Princes was held at Strata Florida Abbey in honour of the heir of Gwynedd. Llywelyn in 1239 suffered a stroke and retired from active work in the Welsh government, he died only a year later in 1240.

=== Prince Dafydd II ===
Prince Dafydd II (Dafydd ap Llywelyn / David II, March 1212 – 25 February 1246), the son of Llywelyn the Great was installed as heir of Gwynedd by the Prince of Wales. While King Henry III of England had accepted Dafydd II and his Royal claims to Gwynedd and Wales, Henry invaded Gwynedd, and Dafydd II was forced to negotiate peace near St. Asaph, on 29 August 1241, under the terms of the Treaty of Gwerneigron, Dafydd II gave up all his lands outside Gwynedd. Dafydd II was ruthless with his power, like his predecessors he'd imprisoned his own brother, once for 6 years, and again in Criccieth and then in the Tower of London. It was the Bishop of Bangor who negotiated letting Prince Gruffudd move to a better location in London. Gruffudd fell to his death in March 1244 while trying to escape from the Tower of London by climbing down a knotted sheet.

With his main rival dead, Dafydd formed an alliance with other Welsh rulers and began a campaign against the English occupation of parts of Wales, all the while communicating with Pope Innocent IV in the Vatican City, Rome, talking about the powers bestowed on him by his predecessors as the ruler of Gwynedd. After savage fighting, the campaign was successful, however, Llywelyn's former seneschal Sir Tudur ap Ednyfed Fychan was captured by Henry III's forces in September 1245 in the battle against Dafydd II, yet Tudur was released in 1247 after swearing fealty to the King of England. Dafydd II died a sudden and natural death on 25 February 1246, this brought a halt to the succession crisis which was fuelling the wars, his widow Isabella de Braose returned to England, living in Haverford, she died 2 years later.

=== Prince Llywelyn II, the Last ===
Prince Llywelyn II (Welsh: Llywelyn Ein Llyw Olaf, lit. 'Llywelyn, Our Last Leader', Llywelyn ap Gruffudd, 1223 – 11 December 1282) was living in Gwynedd at the time of his succession to the throne and had fought alongside his uncle Dafydd II during the last campaign of his reign. This gave him an advantage over his elder brother Owain who had been imprisoned in England with his father since 1242. Owain returned to Gwynedd from England, immediately after the news of the death of Prince Dafydd the IInd. Llywelyn and Owain were able to come to an agreement during an arranged peace accord by King Henry III of England, the Treaty of Woodstock, they were to share a realm west of Conwy, the treaty only lasted 8 years.

The younger brother of Llywelyn II was Dafydd III, who had come of age by 14 and was invited by Henry III to pay homage in 1253. But in the spirit of his ancestors, he went to battle with his brother by forming an alliance with their other brother Owain and fought at the Battle of Bryn Derwin where they met with respective armies. Llywelyn II in victory imprisoned his brothers Owain (until 1277), and Dafydd III for around a years time, Dafydd III eventually gained favour by 1277 working in conjunction with the Crown of England by gaining land on the northern border of England and Wales, Dafydd III married Elizabeth Ferrers and had offspring, while Owain was given the title Lord of Llŷn. Llywelyn was seen as a figurehead for the new state of Wales but had to coordinate with the newly formed Norman dynasty neighbouring to the east of Gwynedd, this was formalised with the Treaty of Montgomery later in 1267.

With his brothers out of contention, Llyewlyn II was the sole ruler and this allowed for over a decade of unbroken military success, aided by the weakness of the Crown of England and the support of his seneschal Goronwy ab Ednyfed, he triumphed in battle by reuniting north Wales. Llywelyn II made an alliance with the Montfort family, marrying Eleanor de Montfort in 1275. Eleanor was the daughter of Simon de Montfort, 6th Earl of Leicester, who had been integral in the English civil war by rebelling during the Second Barons' War. This time it was another Pope, Clement IV who negotiated peace with the Welsh Prince, insisting to disassociate from the Monforts after the Battle of Evesham. Llywelyn II and Montfort married twice, once in secret in 1275, and once again after the marriage was given consent by the new brother-in-law of Llywelyn II, Edward I, only after Eleanor herself was placed under house arrest for three years for passing through Bristol with her father's banner on board a ship, their daughter Gwenllian ferch Llywelyn was orphaned before her first birthday, she was the last of her line.

Succession would continue with a new King of England, Edward I would later acquire the title of the Prince of Wales. The Treaty of Aberconwy was signed in 1277 by Llywelyn II, it was a formal agreement to hand over the power Gwynedd he had accumulated throughout Wales, and the new House of Plantagenet was of French, Norman origins. However Llywelyn's brother Dafydd III still had different ideas, it was he who provoked the incident by attacking Hawarden castle on Palm Sunday in 1282. Later on in November 1282 the Archbishop of Canterbury, John Peckham, visited North Wales to mediate any potential conflict between sovereigns. Prince Llywelyn II was offered a financial incentive, and an English estate for his family, only if he were to surrender Gwynedd's territory to Edward. Llywelyn II rejected the offer. The next month, on 11 December 1282, after not being recognised Llywelyn was killed in an ambush. His head sent to London, his body interred to Abbeycwmhir.

=== Prince Dafydd III ===
The arms used by Dafydd ap Gruffudd were a variant of the Aberffraw Arms

After generations of civil strife in Gwynedd, it was Dafydd ap Gruffydd (David III, 11 July – 3 October 1283) named Dafydd III, the grandson of Llywelyn the Great who was next to gain the Prince of Wales title. From the offset it was Dafydd III who was immersed in Royal life representing the Welsh royal family. During 1253, Dafydd III attended an event and paid homage to the English court with Queen Eleanor, and Richard of Cornwall, as Henry III was in Gascony. That era however was the starting point for military campaigns against his brother Llywelyn II from 1255, Llywelyn II jailed him for a year after the battle of Bryn Derwin. Dafydd III 1263 revolted against Llywelyn II once more, this time failing badly enough to flee to England, and a year later was offered the lands of the English rebel Baron Boteler after the battle of Evesham during an English civil war. Dafydd III had joined the English court life with Henry III and was in England until 1267. Again it was another Pope, Ottobuono, Adrian V who negotiated between the Royal families of England and Wales, peace ensued in Wales for another 6 years when Dafydd III was councillor to his brother, the Prince of Wales. Peace ensues until another coup is formed involving Gruffydd ap Gwenwynwyn Prince of Powys (whose father was arrested by King John), and falls apart due to severe storms. Dafydd III was forced to flee to England once more, this time pledging allegiance to King Edward I in 1274, and is decorated a knight and considered a friend. Years later in 1277, Dafydd III returns to haunt Wales accompanying Edward I, and on 16 August an agreement of peace is made as to how to share the spoils of war, by 10 November Llywelyn I submits to the English Crown at the Treaty of Aberconwy. The lands of Snowdonia, Anglesey, and Penllyn (cantref) are shared amongst the Princes and a dowry is given to Dafydd III, along with an estate in Cheshire and a consented marriage to the daughter of a former adversary, William de Ferrers the 5th Earl of Derby.

Later in his life, after returning to Wales, Dafydd III changes alliance once again and continues to fight against the English Crown at risk of being a traitor. The Welsh courts had kept the support of Goronowy ap Heilin, the seneschal of Gwynedd who also supported his brother Llywelyn II, Goronwy was the Lord of Rhôs. Dafydd III also had the support of Hywel ap Rhys Gryg son of Rhys Gryg, and his brother Rhys Wyndod, the disinherited princes of Deheubarth. Dafydd III had rekindled his ancestors wish for Welsh Independence, however the involvement in rebellion had been against agreements in place the treaty of Aberconwy. The provocation on 22 March, Palm Sunday in 1282 was an attack on Hawarden castle and was the final conflict of the Kingdom of Gwynedd.

Dafydd III, like his brothers had incurred the wrath of the English forces, the Norman army encircled Snowdonia and starved the Welsh people, Dafydd III was soon moving desperately from one fort to another as effective resistance was systematically crushed. Dolwyddelan Castle, which was at risk of becoming encircled and trapped, was the first castle to be abandoned on 18 January 1283. The next was Dolbadarn Castle, the castle served as a base, but by March of that year, this noble site in the heartland of Snowdonia was also under threat from foreign forces and Dafydd III was forced to retreat once again. Finally, Dafydd III moved his headquarters south to Castell y Bere near Llanfihangel-y-pennant. From this point forward the Prince, royal family, and remaining members of the Welsh government were all fugitives on the run, sleeping outdoors whilst being forced to keep moving from place to place to avoid capture. Castell Y Bere's starving garrison would eventually surrender on 25 April and then be given to William de Valence, 1st Earl of Pembroke. After the fall of Y Bere, Dafydd III's movements are speculative but he is recorded in May 1283 as leading raids from the mountains, supported by his seneschal Goronwy ap Heilyn, and Prince's of Deheubarth, Hywel ap Rhys and Rhys Wyndod.

"The last months saw inward disintegration as well as submission to superior force. Nevertheless, Goronwy ap Heilin had committed himself to the struggle and died in rebellion, alongside the disinherited princes who stood with Dafydd ap Gruffudd in the last springtime of the principality of Wales, diehards who knew that theirs was not the heroism of a new beginning but the ultimate stand of the very last cohort clutching the figment of the political order that they had once been privileged to know."

On 21 June 1283, Dafydd III was captured in the uplands above Abergwyngregyn close to Bera Mawr in a secret hiding place recorded as "Nanhysglain". King Edward I decreed, in ad querendum filium David primogenitum, and was caught by "men of his own tongue". The last Royal family of Wales were imprisoned, and Dafydd III was executed by hanging in Shrewsbury for treason, his body was dismembered and he suffered same fate as his brother, Llywelyn II with his head put on a pole for display at the Tower of London, the bard Bleddyn Fardd made his elegy. After the capture of the last true Royal family of Gwynedd, the Princes, including Llywelyn ap Dafydd were imprisoned in Bristol Castle by the English Crown, and daughters became Nuns in Sempringham and other monasteries.

== End of independence ==
Wales after the Statute of Rhuddlan 1284

Following the death of Llywelyn II in 1282, and the execution of his brother Dafydd III the following year, eight centuries of independent rule by the House of Gwynedd came to an end, and the kingdom, which had long been one of the final holdouts to total English domination of Wales, was annexed to England. The remaining important members of the ruling house were all arrested and imprisoned for the remainder of their lives. Under the terms of the Statute of Rhuddlan in 1284 Wales was broken up and re-organised into six shires. The Snowdonia district in Gwynedd was made into three settlements, creating the counties of Anglesey, Carnarvonshire, Merionethshire, and the rest of Wales split beyond the Rivers Dee and Conwy, making Denbighshire and Flintshire in North Wales, and Cardigan and Carmarthen to the south of Wales.

The Pura Walia was the new definition for the Welsh marshland. Pura Wallia was effectively the new counties which had been Gwynedd, Carmarthenshire and Cardiganshire and Marchia Wallie were defined through division of lands still held by the Welsh people and the Norman castles built in the Marchia Wallie. The Pura Walia continued to be within a nominal Principality of Wales ruled by the Council of Wales at Ludlow as a part of the English crown.

There were many Gwynedd-based rebellions after 1284 with varying degrees of success with most being led by peripheral members of the old royal house. In particular the rebellions of Prince Madoc in 1294, and of Owain Lawgoch (the great-nephew of Llywelyn ap Gruffudd) between 1372 and 1378 are most notable. Because of this the old royal house was purged and any surviving members went into hiding. A final rebellion in 1400 led by Owain Glyndŵr, a member of the rival royal house of Powys, also drew considerable support from within Gwynedd.

The title "Prince of Wales" was recreated after Llywelyn II, Prince Edward (later Edward II) was conferred in 1301 at Caernarfon castle, beginning the Principality of Wales. The Welsh Marches would be merged with the principality in 1534 under the Council of Wales and the Marches until all separate governance for Wales. The penal system was eventually abolished, and as an administrative entity, the administrative entity the Marches of Wales was abolished by the joint reigns of King William III of England and Mary II of England (monarchs of England and Scotland combined) in 1689.

== Military ==
According to Sir John Edward Lloyd, the challenges of campaigning in Wales were exposed during the 20-year Norman invasion. If a defender could bar any road, control any river-crossing or mountain pass, and control the coastline around Wales, then the risks of extended campaigning in Wales were too great.

The Welsh method of warfare during the reign of Henry II is described by Gerald of Wales in his work Descriptio Cambriae written c. 1190:

Their mode of fighting consists in chasing the enemy or in retreating. This light-armed people, relying more on their activity than on their strength, cannot struggle for the field of battle, enter into close engagement, or endure long and severe actions...though defeated and put to flight on one day, they are ready to resume the combat on the next, neither dejected by their loss, nor by their dishonour; and although, perhaps, they do not display great fortitude in open engagements and regular conflicts, yet they harass the enemy by ambuscades and nightly sallies. Hence, neither oppressed by hunger or cold, not fatigued by martial labours, nor despondent in adversity, but ready, after a defeat, to return immediately to action, and again endure the dangers of war.
--The Historical Works of Giraldus Cambrensis translated by Sir Richard Colt-Hoare (1894), p. 511

The Welsh were revered for the skills of their bowmen. Additionally, the Welsh learned from their Norman rivals. During the generations of warfare and close contact with the Normans, Gruffudd ap Cynan and other Welsh leaders learned the arts of knighthood and adapted them for Wales. By Gruffudd's death in 1137, Gwynedd could field hundreds of heavy well-armed cavalry as well as their traditional bowmen and infantry.

They make use of light arms, which do not impede their agility, small coats of mail, bundles of arrows, and long lances, helmets and shields, and more rarely greaves plated with iron. The higher class go to battle mounted on swift and generous steeds, which their country produces; but the greater part of the people fight on foot, on account of the marshy nature and unevenness of the soil. The horsemen, as their situation or occasion requires, willingly serve as infantry, in attacking or retreating; and they either walk bare-footed, or make use of high shoes, roughly constructed with untanned leather. In time of peace, the young men, by penetrating the deep recesses of the woods, and climbing the tops of mountains, learn by practice to endure fatigue through day and night..
--The Historical Works of Giraldus Cambrensis translated by Sir Richard Colt-Hoare (1894), p. 491

In the end, Wales was defeated militarily by the improved ability of the English navy to blockade or seize areas essential for agricultural production such as Anglesey. With control of the Menai Strait, an invading army could regroup on Anglesey; without control of the Menai an army could be stranded there; and any occupying force on Anglesey could deny the vast harvest of the island to the Welsh.

Lack of food would force the disbandment of any large Welsh force besieged within the mountains. Following the occupation, Welsh soldiers were conscripted to serve in the English Army. During the revolt of Owain Glyndŵr the Welsh adapted the new skills they had learnt to guerrilla tactics and lightning raids. Owain Glyndŵr reputedly used the mountains with such advantage that many of the exasperated English soldieries suspected him of being a magician able to control the natural elements.

== Administration ==
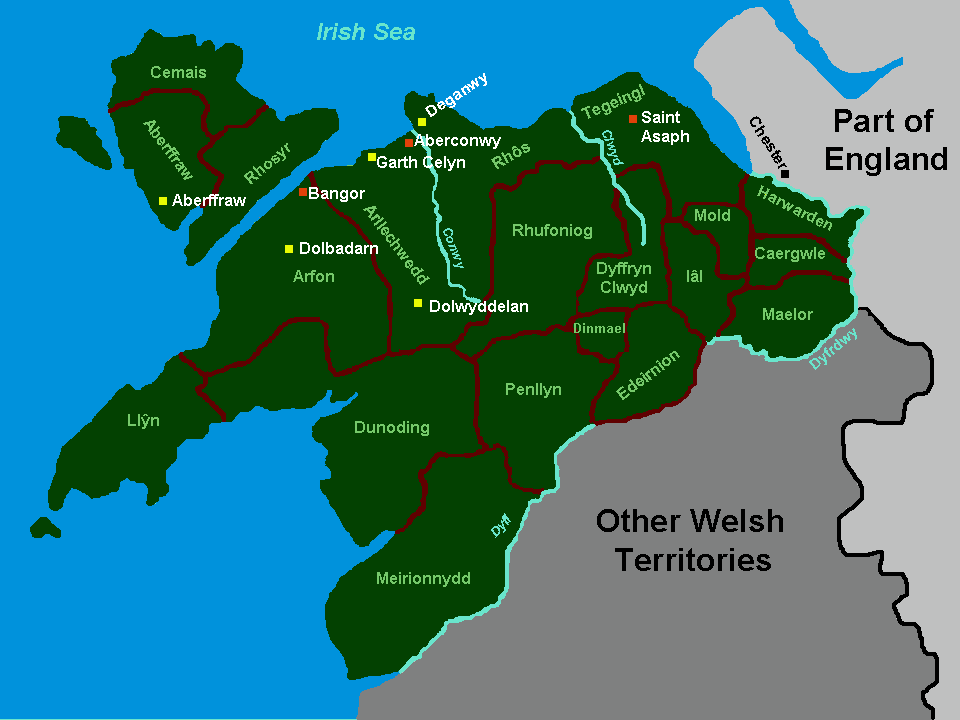
Principal administrative divisions of medieval Gwynedd (traditional territorial extent)

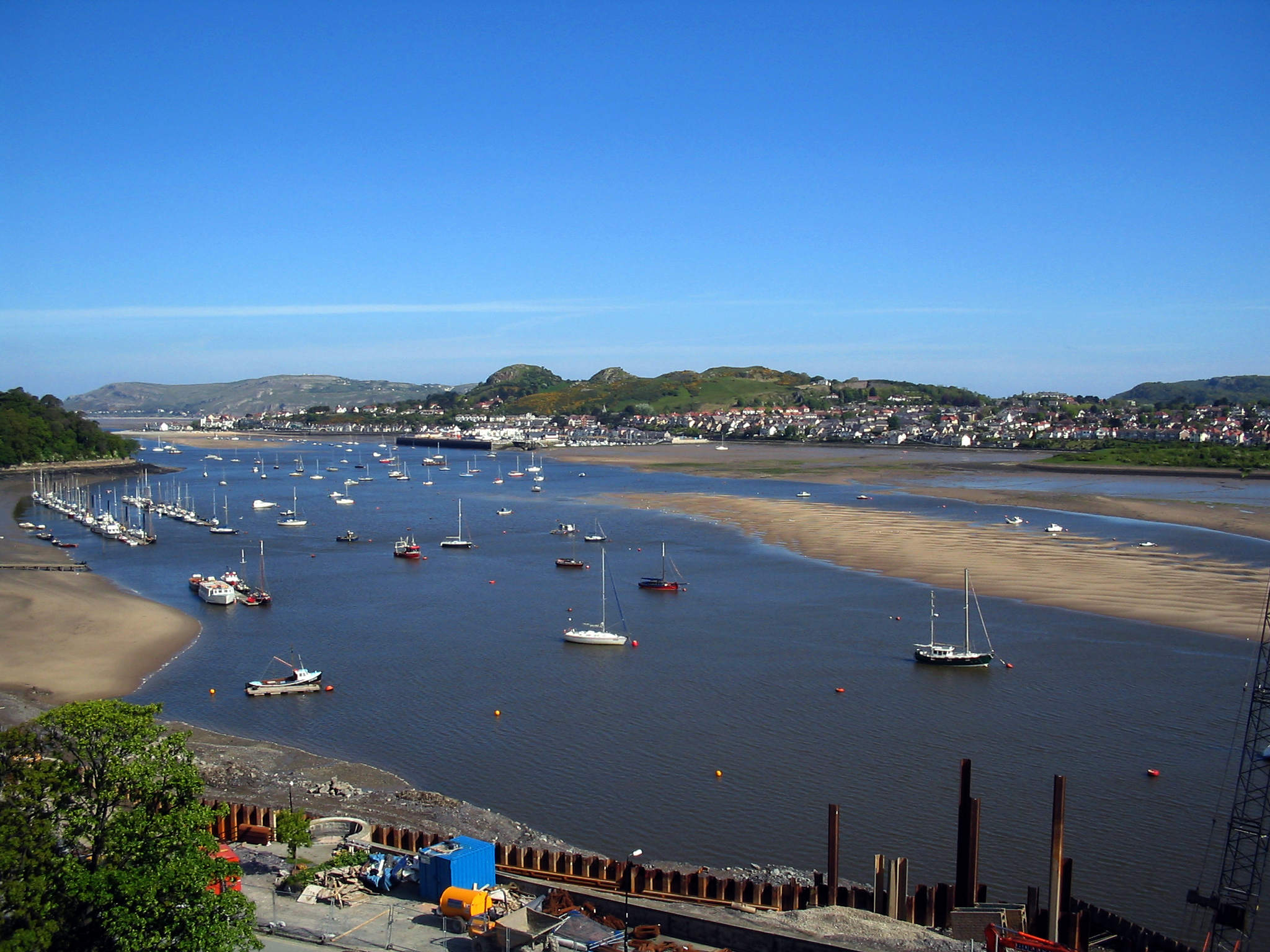
The Afon Conwy is the traditional border between upper and lower Gwynedd

In early times Gwynedd (or Venedotia) may have been ruled from Chester, which is shown in the subsidiary title of the current Prince of Wales, Earl of Chester. After the Battle of Chester in 613 when the city fell to the Anglo-Saxons the royal court moved west to the stronghold at Deganwy Castle near modern Conwy. This site was destroyed by lightning in 812, rebuilt and destroyed again by Saxons in 822. Afterwards Aberffraw on Anglesey became the principal power base, with exceptions such as Gruffydd ap Llywelyn's court at Rhuddlan. However, as the English fleet became more powerful and particularly after the Norman colonisation of Ireland began it became indefensible and from about 1200 until 1283, at Abergwyngregyn or simply called just "Aber" (its anglicised shortened form adopted by the Crown of England after the conquest) was the new family home of the 'Lord of Snowdown' on the banks of the menai Strait. Joan, Lady of Wales, died there in 1237; Dafydd ap Llywelyn in 1246; Eleanor de Montfort, Lady of Wales, wife of Llywelyn ap Gruffudd, Prince of Wales ("Tywysog Cymru" in modern Welsh), on 19 June 1282, giving birth to a daughter, Gwenllian. The royal home was occupied and expropriated by the English Crown in early 1283.

The traditional sphere of Aberffraw's influence in north Wales included the Isle of Anglesey (Ynys Môn) as their early seat of authority, and Gwynedd Uwch Conwy (Gwynedd above the Conwy, or upper Gwynedd), and the Perfeddwlad (the Middle Country) also known as Gwynedd Is Conwy (Gwynedd below the Conwy, or lower Gwynedd). Additional lands were acquired through vassalage or conquest, and by regaining lands lost to Marcher lords, particularly that of Ceredigion, Powys Fadog, and Powys Wenwynwyn. However, these areas were always considered an addition to Gwynedd, never part of it.

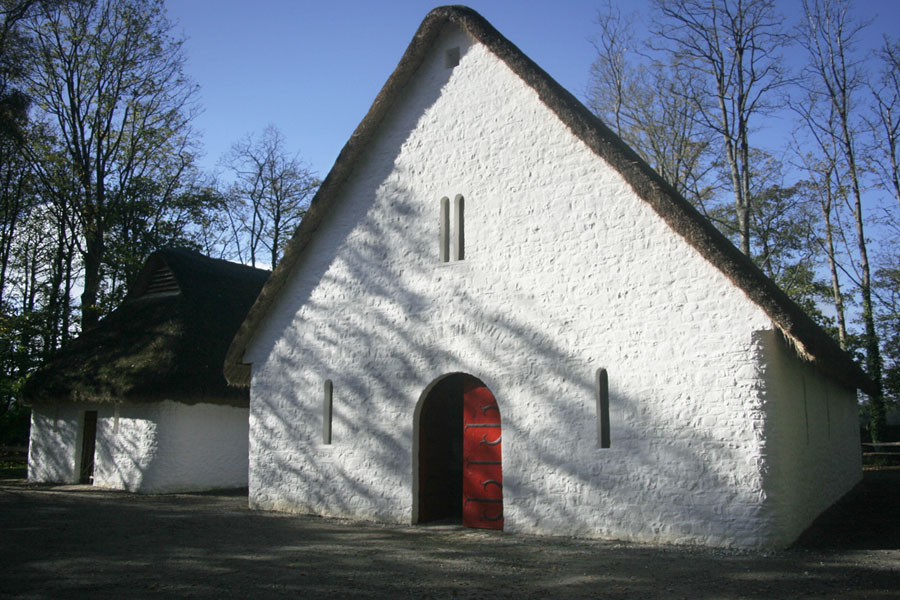
Reconstruction of Llys Llywelyn at St Fagans

After the Norman conquest, the residents of Llanfaes were moved to make way for Beaumaris Castle on Anglesey. The newly built Llys Rhosyr replaced the now abandoned Llys Aberffraw was one of 3 main courts on Anglesey, only due to a sandstorm in 1332 the Llys also became disused and unattended until excavations in the 20th century. The courts (Welsh: Llysoedd) were administrative centres in the Kingdom, the courts were royal residences, but also were to collect taxes and function the same as a modern government building.

Gwynedd was traditionally divided into using nature as borders, the rivers Conwy and Dee were used to define lands in relation to the counties. Gwynedd Uwch Conwy and Gwynedd Is Conwy (with the River Conwy forming the border), which included Anglesey (Môn). The kingdom of the Princes of Snowdonia was administered under Welsh custom through thirteen Cantrefi each containing, in theory, one hundred settlements or Trefi. Most cantrefs were also divided into cymydau (English commotes). A complete census was created in the Red Book of Hergest during the end of the 14th century.

=== Anglesey (Welsh: Ynys Môn) ===
Commote of Anglesey

| Commote | Modern local | Notes |
|---|---|---|
| Aberffraw | Aberffraw | Historic seat of rulers of Gwynedd |
| Cemais | Cemaes | |
| Talebolyon | | |
| Llan-faes | Llan-maes | |
| Penrhos | Penrhos | |
| Rhosyr | Newborough, Niwbro | in 1294, refounded to house displaced villagers from Llanfaes |

=== Upper Gwynedd, Conwy ===
Gwynedd above the Conwy, or upper Gwynedd

Commote of Arllechwedd

| Commote | Modern local | Notes |
|---|---|---|
| Arllechwedd Uchaf | Abergwyngregyn, Conwy County Borough | |
| Arllechwedd Isaf | Trefriw, Conwy County Borough | |

Arfon Commote

| Commote | Modern local | Notes |
|---|---|---|
| Arfon Uwch Gwyrfai | Gwynedd | Arfon above Gwyrfai |
| Arfon Is Gwyrfai | Gwynedd | Arfon beneath Gwyrfai |

Dunoding Commote

| Commote | Modern local | Notes |
|---|---|---|
| Ardudwy | Meirionnydd area within Gwynedd | |
| Eifionydd | Dwyfor area within Gwynedd | Named after Eifion ap Dunod ap Cunedda |

Commote of Llyn

| Commote | Modern local | Notes |
|---|---|---|
| Dinllaen | Dwyfor council in Gwynedd county | |
| Cymydmaen | Dwyfor council in Gwynedd county | |
| Cafflogion | | |

Meirionnydd Commote

| Commote | Modern local | Notes |
|---|---|---|
| Ystumaner | Merionethshire council in Gwynedd county | |
| Tal-y-bont | | |

=== Lower Gwynedd, Conwy ===
Also known as Perfeddwlad, or "the Middle Country" or Gwynedd Is Conwy (Gwynedd below the Conwy, or lower Gwynedd)

- Cantref Tegeingl:
  - Cwnsyllt
  - Prestatyn
  - Rhuddlan
- Dyffryn Clwyd:
  - Colion
  - Llannerch
  - Dogfeiling
- Rhufoniog
  - Ceinmeirch
  - Uwch Aled
  - Is Aled
- Cantref Rhos
  - Uwch Dulas
  - Is Dulas
  - Y Creuddyn

== Legacy ==
Following Edward's conquest, the lands of Gwynedd proper were divided among the English counties of Anglesey, Caernarfonshire, Merionethshire, Denbighshire, and Flintshire. The Local Government Act 1972 reformed these, creating a new county (now called a "preserved county") of Gwynedd which comprised Anglesey and Llyn, Arfon, Dunoding, and Meirionydd on the mainland. The modern principal area of Gwynedd established by the Local Government (Wales) Act 1994 no longer includes Anglesey.

== See also ==
- List of rulers of Gwynedd
- List of rulers in Wales
- House of Aberffraw
- King of Wales
- List of kings in Wales from the Matter of Britain
- Family tree of Welsh monarchs
- List of legendary kings of Britain
- Gwynedd

== General sources ==
=== Books ===
==== Primary sources ====
- Barbier, Paul (1908). The age of Owain Gwynedd. Newport: London D. Nutt.
- Barlow, Frank (2000). William Rufus. Yale University Press. ISBN 0-300-08291-6.
- Bartlett, Robert (2000). England Under the Norman and Angevin Kings: 1075–1225. Oxford: Clarendon Press. ISBN 0-19-822741-8.
- Davies, John (1994). A History of Wales. Penguin Group. ISBN 0140284753.
- Jenkins, Dafydd, ed. (1986). The Law of Hywel Dda: Law Texts from Medieval Wales. Llandysul: Gomer Press. ISBN 0863832776.
- Koch, John T., ed. (1997b). The Gododdin of Aneirin: Text and Context from Dark-Age North Britain (PDF). Cardiff: University of Wales Press. ISBN 9780708313749. Archived from the original on 4 April 2025.
- Lloyd, J. E. (1911). A History of Wales; From the Norman Invasion to the Edwardian Conquest. Vol. 1. Longmans, Green & Co.
- Lloyd, J. E. (2004) [1911]. A History of Wales; From the Norman Invasion to the Edwardian Conquest. New York City: Barnes & Noble Publishing, Inc. ISBN 0-7607-5241-9.
- Llwyd, Angharad (1832). A history of the island of Anglesey.
- Lowe, Walter Bezant (1912). The Heart of Northern Wales. Vol. 1. – The Heart of Northern Wales at Google Books
- Lynch, Frances M. B. (1995). Gwynedd (A Guide to Ancient and Historic Wales). The Stationery Office. ISBN 978-0-11-701574-6.
- Maund, Kari L. (2006). The Welsh Kings: Warriors, Warlords, and Princes (3 ed.). Tempus Publishing. ISBN 978-0-7524-2973-1.
- Moore, David (2005). The Welsh Wars of Independence. Tempus Publishing. ISBN 978-0-7524-3321-9.
- Parry, Thomas; Bell, H. Idris (1955). "A History of Welsh Literature". Oxford University Press – via Internet Archive.
- Rodway, Simon; Isaac, Graham R.; Sims-Williams, Patrick, eds. (2013). Rhyddiaith y 13eg Ganrif: Fersiwn 2.0 [Prose of the 13th century: Version 2.0] (PDF) (in Welsh). Aberystwyth: Aberystwyth University. doi:10.20391/3abf4ef1-e364-4cce-859d-92bf4035b303. ISBN 0708311873.
- Russell, Paul (15 September 2004). Vita Griffini Filii Conani: The Medieval Latin Life of Gruffudd Ap Cynan. University of Wales Press. ISBN 0708318932.
- Turvey, Roger, ed. (2010). Twenty-One Welsh Princes. Gwasg Carreg Gwalch. ISBN 9781845272692.
- Walker, David (1990). Medieval Wales. Cambridge: Cambridge University Press. ISBN 9780521311533.
- Warner, Philip (1997). Famous Welsh Battles. New York City: Barnes & Noble. ISBN 0-7607-0466-X.
- Williams, J. E. Caerwyn; Lynch, Peredur, eds. (1994). Gwaith Meilyr Brydydd a'i Digsynyddion [The work of Meilyr Brydydd and his Descendants]. Cyfres Beirdd y Tywysogion (in Welsh). Vol. 1. Cardiff: University of Wales Press. ISBN 0708311873.
- Williams, W. Llewelyn (1908). Giraldus Cambrensis, The Itinerary Through Wales and the Description of Wales.

==== Secondary sources ====
- Bown, Ivor (1908). Statutes of Wales. London: T. Fisher Unwin.
- Charles-Edwards, Thomas (2013). Wales and the Britons, 350–1064. Oxford: Oxford University Press. ISBN 9780198217312. IA walesbritons35010000char.
- Davies, John (2002). The Celts. New York City: Cassell Illustrated. ISBN 1-84188-188-0.
- Davies, Rees R. (1987). Conquest, Coexistence, and Change: Wales 1063–1415. Oxford: Clarendon Press. ISBN 978-0-19-821732-9.
- Evans, Gwynfor (2004). Cymru O Hud [Welsh are still here]. Abergwyngregyn: Y Lolfa. ISBN 0-86243-545-5.
- Evans, Simon (1990). A Mediaeval Prince of Wales: the Life of Gruffudd Ap Cynan. Llanerch Enterprises. ISBN 0-947992-58-8.
- Giles, John Allen (1841). The works of Gildas and Nennius. London: James Bohn.
- Hudson, Benjamin T. (2005). Viking Pirates and Christian Princes: Dynasty, Religion, and Empire in the North Atlantic (Illustrated ed.). United States: Oxford University Press. ISBN 0195162374.
- Jones, Owen; Williams, Edward; Pughe, William Owen (1801). Evans, John (ed.). The Myvyrian Archaiology of Wales: collected out of ancient manuscripts. Denbigh: Thomas Gee. "The Myvyrian Archaiology"
- Johnstone, Neil (2000). "Llys and Maerdref: The Royal Courts of the Princes of Gwynedd". Studia Celtica. 34: 167–210.
- Koch, John (2005). Celtic Culture: a historical encyclopedia. Santa Barbara: ABC-Clio.
- Llwyd, Humphrey (2002). Cronica Walliae. University of Wales Press. ISBN 978-0-7083-1638-2.
- Maund, K. L. (1996). Gruffudd ap Cynan: a collaborative biography. Boydell & Brewer. ISBN 0-85115-389-5.
- Morris, John, ed. (1980). Nennius: British History and The Welsh Annals. London: Phillimore. ISBN 9780847662647.
- Morris, John E. (1996). The Welsh Wars of Edward I. Conshohocken, Pennsylvania: Combined Books. ISBN 0-938289-67-5.
- Pargeter, Edith (1989). The Brothers of Gwynedd. Headline Publishing Group. ISBN 9780747232674.
- Penman, Sharon Kay. The Welsh Trilogy. Ballantine Books.
- Pennant, Thomas. A Tour of Wales. Vol. 1–8.
- Pryce, Huw, ed. (2005). The Acts of Welsh Rulers, 1120–1283. Cardiff: University of Wales Press. ISBN 9780708318973. IA actsofwelshruler0000unse.
- Siddons, Michael Powell (1991). The Development of Welsh Heraldry. Vol. 1. Aberystwyth: National Library of Wales. ISBN 090715851X.
- Siddons, Michael Powell (1993). The Development of Welsh Heraldry. Vol. 2. Aberystwyth: National Library of Wales. ISBN 090715851X.
- Smith, Beverley J. (2001). Llywelyn ap Gruffudd, Prince of Wales. University of Wales Press. ISBN 978-0-7083-1474-6.
- Stephenson, David (1984). The Governance of Gwynedd. University of Wales Press. ISBN 978-0-7083-0850-9. OL 22379507M.
- Roger Turvey (2002). "Conflict or Coexistence: Marchia Wallie and Pura Wallia". The Welsh Princes. Routledge. pp. 39–64. doi:10.4324/9781315840802-3. ISBN 9781315840802.
- Williams, John (1860). Brut y Tywysogion; or, The Chronicle of the Princes (reprint ed.). London: Longman Green. "Caradoc of Llancarfan"

=== Dictionary of Welsh biography sources ===
- Lloyd, John Edward (1959). "Cunedda Wledig, flourished 450, British prince". Dictionary of Welsh Biography. National Library of Wales.
- Davies, William Hopkin (1959). "Maelgwn Gwynedd,(died c. 547) king of Gwynedd and monk". Dictionary of Welsh Biography. National Library of Wales.
- Davies, William Hopkin (1959). "Rhun Ap Maelgwn Gwynedd, (fl. 550), ruler of north-west Wales". Dictionary of Welsh Biography. National Library of Wales.
- Lloyd, John Edward (1959). "Cadfan (fl. 620), prince". Dictionary of Welsh Biography. National Library of Wales.
- Lloyd, John Edward (1959). "Cadwallon (died 633), prince". Dictionary of Welsh Biography. National Library of Wales.
- Lloyd, John Edward (1959). "Cadwaladr (died 664), prince". Dictionary of Welsh Biography. National Library of Wales.
- "Rhodri Molwynog (died 754), king of Gwynedd". Dictionary of Welsh Biography. National Library of Wales.
- "Cynan Dindaethwy (died 816) Prince". Dictionary of Welsh Biography. National Library of Wales.
- "Hywel ap Rhodri Molwynog (died 825), king of Gwynedd". Dictionary of Welsh Biography. National Library of Wales.
- Pierce, Thomas Jones (1959). "Merfyn Frych (died 844), king of Gwynedd". Dictionary of Welsh Biography. National Library of Wales.
- Pierce, Thomas Jones (1959). "Rhodri Mawr ('the Great') (died 877), king of Gwynedd, Powys, and Deheubarth". Dictionary of Welsh Biography. National Library of Wales.
- Lloyd, John Edward (1959). "Anarawd ap Rhodri (died 916), prince". Dictionary of Welsh Biography. National Library of Wales.
- Pierce, Thomas Jones (1959). "Idwal Foel ('the Bald '; died 942), king of Gwynedd". Dictionary of Welsh Biography. National Library of Wales.
- Pierce, Thomas Jones (1959). "Iago Ab Idwal Foel (fl. 942–979), king of Gwynedd". Dictionary of Welsh Biography. National Library of Wales.
- Williams, Stephan Joseph (1959). "Hywel Dda (Hywel the Good) (died 950), king and legislator". Dictionary of Welsh Biography. National Library of Wales.
- Pierce, Thomas Jones (1959). "Hywel ap Ieuaf (died 985), king of Gwynedd". Dictionary of Welsh Biography. National Library of Wales.
- Pierce, Thomas Jones (1959). "Ieuaf (or Idwal) ab Idwal Foel (died 985), joint king of Gwynedd". Dictionary of Welsh Biography. National Library of Wales.
- Pierce, Thomas Jones (1959). "Meurif Ab Idwal Foel (died 986), nobleman of Gwynedd". Dictionary of Welsh Biography. National Library of Wales.
- Pierce, Thomas Jones (1959). "Idwal Ap Meurig (died 996), prince of Gwynedd". Dictionary of Welsh Biography. National Library of Wales.
- "Maerdudd ab Owain ap Hywel Dda (died 999)". Dictionary of Welsh Biography. National Library of Wales.
- Pierce, Thomas Jones (1959). "Llywelyn Ap Seisyll (died 1023), king of Deheubarth and Gwynedd". Dictionary of Welsh Biography. National Library of Wales.
- Pierce, Thomas Jones (1959). "Iago ab Idwal Foel (died 1039), king of Gwynedd". Dictionary of Welsh Biography. National Library of Wales.
- Parry, Thomas (1959). "Gruffudd ap Cynan (c. 1055 – 1137), king of Gwynedd". Dictionary of Welsh Biography. National Library of Wales.
- Hudson, Benjamin (1959). "Gruffudd ap Llywelyn (died 1064), king of Gwynedd 1039–1064 and overlord of all the Welsh 1055–1064". Dictionary of Welsh Biography. National Library of Wales.
- "Bleddyn ap Cynfyn (died 1075) Prince". Dictionary of Welsh Biography. National Library of Wales.
- Pierce, Thomas Jones (1959). "Trahaern Ap Caradog (died 1081), king of Gwynedd". Dictionary of Welsh Biography. National Library of Wales.
- Pierce, Thomas Jones (1959). "Iorwerth Drwyndwn (The Flat-nosed) (died probably c. 1174), prince of Gwynedd". Dictionary of Welsh Biography. National Library of Wales.
- Pierce, Thomas Jones (1959). "Owain Gwynedd (c. 1100 – 1170), king of Gwynedd". Dictionary of Welsh Biography. National Library of Wales.
- Roderick, Arthur James (1959). "Hywel ab Owain Gwynedd (died 1170), soldier and poet". Dictionary of Welsh Biography. National Library of Wales.
- Lloyd, John Edward (1959). "Cadwaladr(died 1172), prince". Dictionary of Welsh Biography. National Library of Wales.
- Pierce, Thomas Jones (1959). "Maelgwn ab Owain Gwynedd (died after 1173), prince of Anglesey". Dictionary of Welsh Biography. National Library of Wales.
- Lloyd, John Edward (1959). "Cynan ab Owain (died 1174), prince". Dictionary of Welsh Biography. National Library of Wales.
- Pierce, Thomas Jones (1959). "Rhodri ab Owain (died 1195), a prince of Gwynedd". Dictionary of Welsh Biography. National Library of Wales.
- Lloyd, John Edward (1959). "Dafydd ab Owain Gwynedd (David I, died 1203), king of Gwynedd". Dictionary of Welsh Biography. National Library of Wales.
- Pierce, Thomas Jones (1959). "Llywelyn ap Iorwerth ('Llywelyn the Great', often styled 'Llywelyn I', prince of Gwynedd)". Dictionary of Welsh Biography. National Library of Wales.
- Pierce, Thomas Jones (1959). "Gruffudd ap Llywelyn (died 1064), king of Gwynedd 1039–1064 and overlord of all the Welsh 1055–1064". Dictionary of Welsh Biography. National Library of Wales.
- Pierce, Thomas Jones (1959). "Gruffydd ap Llywelyn (died 1244), prince". Dictionary of Welsh Biography. National Library of Wales.
- Thomas Jones Pierce (1959). "Maredudd ap Cynan ab Owain Gwynedd (died 1212), lord of Eifionydd, part of Ardudwy, and Merioneth and co-founder of the Cistercian house of Cymmer". Dictionary of Welsh Biography. National Library of Wales.
- Pierce, Thomas Jones (1959). "Llywelyn Fawr and Llywelyn Fychan (fl. early 13th century). lords of Merioneth". Dictionary of Welsh Biography. National Library of Wales.
- Lloyd, John Edward (1959). "Dafydd ap Llywelyn (David II, died 1246), Prince". Dictionary of Welsh Biography. National Library of Wales.
- Pierce, Thomas Jones (1959). "Owain ap Gruffydd, or Owain Goch, (fl. 1260), a prince of Gwynedd". Dictionary of Welsh Biography. National Library of Wales.
- Pierce, Thomas Jones (1959). "Llywelyn ap Gruffydd ('Llywelyn the Last,' or Llywelyn II), Prince of Wales (died 1282)". Dictionary of Welsh Biography. National Library of Wales.
- Pierce, Thomas Jones (1959). "Dafydd ap Gruffydd (David III, died 1283), prince of Gwynedd". Dictionary of Welsh Biography. National Library of Wales.
- Pierce, Thomas Jones (1959). "Rhodri ap Gruffydd (died c. 1315), prince of Gwynedd". Dictionary of Welsh Biography. National Library of Wales.
- Pierce, Thomas Jones (1959). "Madog ap Llywelyn, rebel of 1294". Dictionary of Welsh Biography. National Library of Wales.
- Pierce, Thomas Jones (1959). "Owain ap Thomas ap Rhodri (' Owain Lawgoch '; died 1378), a soldier of fortune and pretender to the principality of Wales". Dictionary of Welsh Biography. National Library of Wales.
- Pierce, Thomas Jones (1959). "Owain Glyndŵr (c. 1354 – 1416), 'Prince of Wales'". Dictionary of Welsh Biography. National Library of Wales.

=== Wiki source – Dictionary of National Biography and Encyclopædia ===
- Kingsford, Charles Lethbridge (1894). "Nennius" . In Lee, Sidney (ed.). Dictionary of National Biography. Vol. 40. London: Smith, Elder & Co. pp. 217–221.
- Lloyd, John Edward (1896). "Rhys ap Gruffydd" . In Lee, Sidney (ed.). Dictionary of National Biography. Vol. 48. London: Smith, Elder & Co. p. 89.
- Tout, Thomas Frederick (1890). "Gruffydd ab Llewelyn (d.1063)" . In Stephen, Leslie; Lee, Sidney (eds.). Dictionary of National Biography. Vol. 23. London: Smith, Elder & Co. p. 305-307.
- Tout, Thomas Frederick (1890). "Gruffydd ab Cynan" . In Stephen, Leslie; Lee, Sidney (eds.). Dictionary of National Biography. Vol. 23. London: Smith, Elder & Co. pp. 301–304.
- Tout, Thomas Frederick (1890). "Gruffydd ab Llywelyn (d.1244)" . In Stephen, Leslie; Lee, Sidney (eds.). Dictionary of National Biography. Vol. 23. London: Smith, Elder & Co. pp. 307–308.
- Tout, Thomas Frederick (1890). "Glendower, Owen" . In Stephen, Leslie (ed.). Dictionary of National Biography. Vol. 21. London: Smith, Elder & Co. pp. 427–434.
- Tout, Thomas Frederick (1891). "Howel Vychan" . In Lee, Sidney (ed.). Dictionary of National Biography. Vol. 28. London: Smith, Elder & Co. p. 105.
- Tout, Thomas Frederick (1891). "Howel Dda" . In Lee, Sidney (ed.). Dictionary of National Biography. Vol. 28. London: Smith, Elder & Co. pp. 105–107.
- Tout, Thomas Frederick (1891). "Idwal Voel" . In Lee, Sidney (ed.). Dictionary of National Biography. Vol. 28. London: Smith, Elder & Co. p. 412.
- Thomas, Daniel Lleufer (1891). "Iago ab Idwal Voel" . In Lee, Sidney (ed.). Dictionary of National Biography. Vol. 28. London: Smith, Elder & Co. pp. 407–408.
- Tout, Thomas Frederick (1891). "Howel ab Ieuav" . In Lee, Sidney (ed.). Dictionary of National Biography. Vol. 28. London: Smith, Elder & Co. p. 107.
- Thomas, Daniel Lleufer (1891). "Idwal ab Meirig" . In Lee, Sidney (ed.). Dictionary of National Biography. Vol. 28. London: Smith, Elder & Co. p. 412.
- Thomas, Daniel Lleufer (1891). "Iago ab Idwal ab Meirig" . In Lee, Sidney (ed.). Dictionary of National Biography. Vol. 28. London: Smith, Elder & Co. p. 408.
- Lloyd, John Edward (1893). "Maelgwn Gwynedd" . In Lee, Sidney (ed.). Dictionary of National Biography. Vol. 35. London: Smith, Elder & Co. pp. 305–306.
- Lloyd, John Edward (1893). "Maredudd ab Owain" . In Lee, Sidney (ed.). Dictionary of National Biography. Vol. 36. London: Smith, Elder & Co. p. 130.
- Tout, Thomas Frederick (1893). "Llywelyn ab Gruffydd" . In Lee, Sidney (ed.). Dictionary of National Biography. Vol. 34. London: Smith, Elder & Co. pp. 13–21.
- Lloyd, John Edward (1894). "Merfyn Frych" . In Lee, Sidney (ed.). Dictionary of National Biography. Vol. 37. London: Smith, Elder & Co. p. 277.
- Miller, Arthur (1885). "Anarawd" . In Stephen, Leslie (ed.). Dictionary of National Biography. Vol. 1. London: Smith, Elder & Co. p. 370.
- Stephens, William Richard Wood (1886). "Cædwalla (d.634)" . In Stephen, Leslie (ed.). Dictionary of National Biography. Vol. 8. London: Smith, Elder & Co. p. 201.
- Tout, Thomas Frederick (1886). "Cadvan (d.617? or 634?)" . In Stephen, Leslie (ed.). Dictionary of National Biography. Vol. 8. London: Smith, Elder & Co. p. 190.
- Tout, Thomas Frederick (1886). "Cadwaladr (d.1172)" . In Stephen, Leslie (ed.). Dictionary of National Biography. Vol. 8. London: Smith, Elder & Co. pp. 190–191.
- Tout, Thomas Frederick (1888). "Davydd I" . In Stephen, Leslie (ed.). Dictionary of National Biography. Vol. 14. London: Smith, Elder & Co. pp. 199–200.
- Tout, Thomas Frederick (1888). "Davydd III" . In Stephen, Leslie (ed.). Dictionary of National Biography. Vol. 14. London: Smith, Elder & Co. pp. 202–205.
- Tout, Thomas Frederick (1893). "Llywelyn ab Iorwerth" . In Lee, Sidney (ed.). Dictionary of National Biography. Vol. 34. London: Smith, Elder & Co. pp. 7–13.
- Tout, Thomas Frederick (1893). "Llywelyn ab Seisyll" . In Lee, Sidney (ed.). Dictionary of National Biography. Vol. 34. London: Smith, Elder & Co. pp. 6–7.
- Tout, Thomas Frederick (1895). "Owain Gwynedd" . In Lee, Sidney (ed.). Dictionary of National Biography. Vol. 41. London: Smith, Elder & Co. pp. 391–395.
- Lloyd, John Edward (1896). "Rhun ap Maelgwn" . In Lee, Sidney (ed.). Dictionary of National Biography. Vol. 48. London: Smith, Elder & Co. p. 86.
- Lloyd, John Edward (1896). "Rhodri Mawr" . In Lee, Sidney (ed.). Dictionary of National Biography. Vol. 48. London: Smith, Elder & Co. p. 85.
- Lloyd, John Edward (1896). "Rhodri ab Owain" . In Lee, Sidney (ed.). Dictionary of National Biography. Vol. 48. London: Smith, Elder & Co. pp. 85–86.
- Lloyd, John Edward (1899). "Trahaearn ap Caradog" . In Lee, Sidney (ed.). Dictionary of National Biography. Vol. 57. London: Smith, Elder & Co. p. 147.
- Tout, Thomas Frederick (1885–1900). "Davydd II" . Dictionary of National Biography. London: Smith, Elder & Co.
- Chisholm, Hugh, ed. (1911). "David (Welsh princes)" . Encyclopædia Britannica. Vol. 7 (11th ed.). Cambridge University Press. p. 860.
- Chisholm, Hugh, ed. (1911). "Llewelyn" . Encyclopædia Britannica. Vol. 16 (11th ed.). Cambridge University Press. p. 831.
