= Arfon (cantref) =

Welsh medieval cantref

Coordinates: 53.083°N 4.000°W

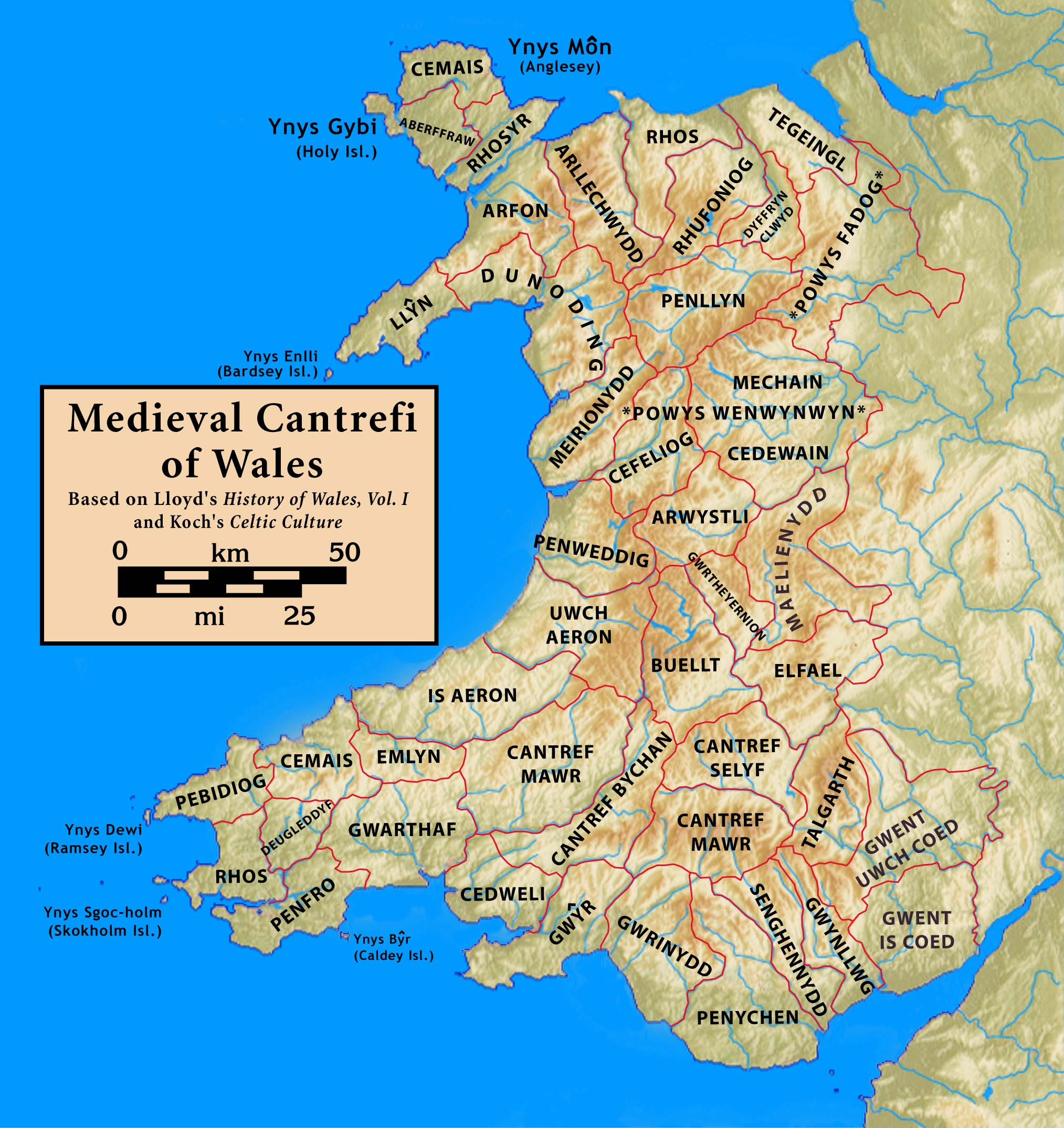
Map of Welsh cantrefs

Arfon (or Arvon) was a medieval Welsh cantref in north-west Wales. It was the core of the kingdom of Gwynedd. Later it was included in the new county of Caernarfonshire, together with Llŷn and Arllechwedd under the terms of the Statute of Rhuddlan in 1284. The island of Anglesey faced it across the Menai Strait; to the east was the cantref of Arllechwedd, to the south the commote of Eifionydd (which, together with Ardudwy, was part of the cantref of Dunoding), and to the west was the cantref of Llŷn.

The Welsh name of Anglesey is Môn, and Arfon's name means "opposite or facing Môn" (with Môn becoming Fôn through soft mutation). The cantref's position gave it control over the Menai Strait, which has played an important part in Welsh history. Broadly speaking, it stretched from the peaks of Yr Eifl in the west to Afon Cegin, a stream just east of Bangor, and inland from the shores of the Menai southwards into the heart of Snowdonia (Eryri), including Dyffryn Nantlle and the strategic Llanberis Pass.

In geographical terms, the cantref was very variable, including fertile land and rich pastures on the shore of the Menai and in the valleys, a number of woods on the slopes and mountains to the south, and the highest mountains in Wales such as Snowdon and Tryfan.

Parishes and commotes of the cantref of Arfon

Arfon comprised two commotes, which were apparently created later in its history. They were called Uwch Gwyrfai and Is Gwyrfai, indicating their respective positions above and below the Gwyrfai River.

During the Iron Age and the Roman era, it was part of the territory of the Ordovices. The pre-Roman hill fort Dinas Dinorwig and the Roman fort of Segontium were located there. The main defensive fortress in the era of the Welsh princes was Dolbadarn Castle, near modern Llanberis.

Important ecclesiastical centres were to be found in Bangor and Clynnog Fawr. The bishops of Bangor, the successors of St Deiniol, had an extensive holding of land in the north of the cantref. This area, known as Maenol Bangor, contained 13 hamlets, whose tenants paid rent to the bishop. Clynnog owned broad lands in Llŷn and Anglesey.

Arfon features prominently in Welsh mythology, particularly in the Fourth Branch of the Mabinogi. Math fab Mathonwy's court at Caer Dathyl was located there, as was Aranrhod's at Caer Aranrhod. The battle between the forces of Math and Pryderi took place in Arfon. Lleu Llaw Gyffes flies to Nantlleu in Arfon in the form of an eagle after his attempted murder by Gronw Pebr.

A local government district of the same name existed from 1974 to 1996, when Gwynedd became a unitary authority. The name Arfon itself is still used for the area, as it has been for centuries in Wales.
