= Arllechwedd =

Welsh medieval cantref

Coordinates: 53.006°N 3.844°W

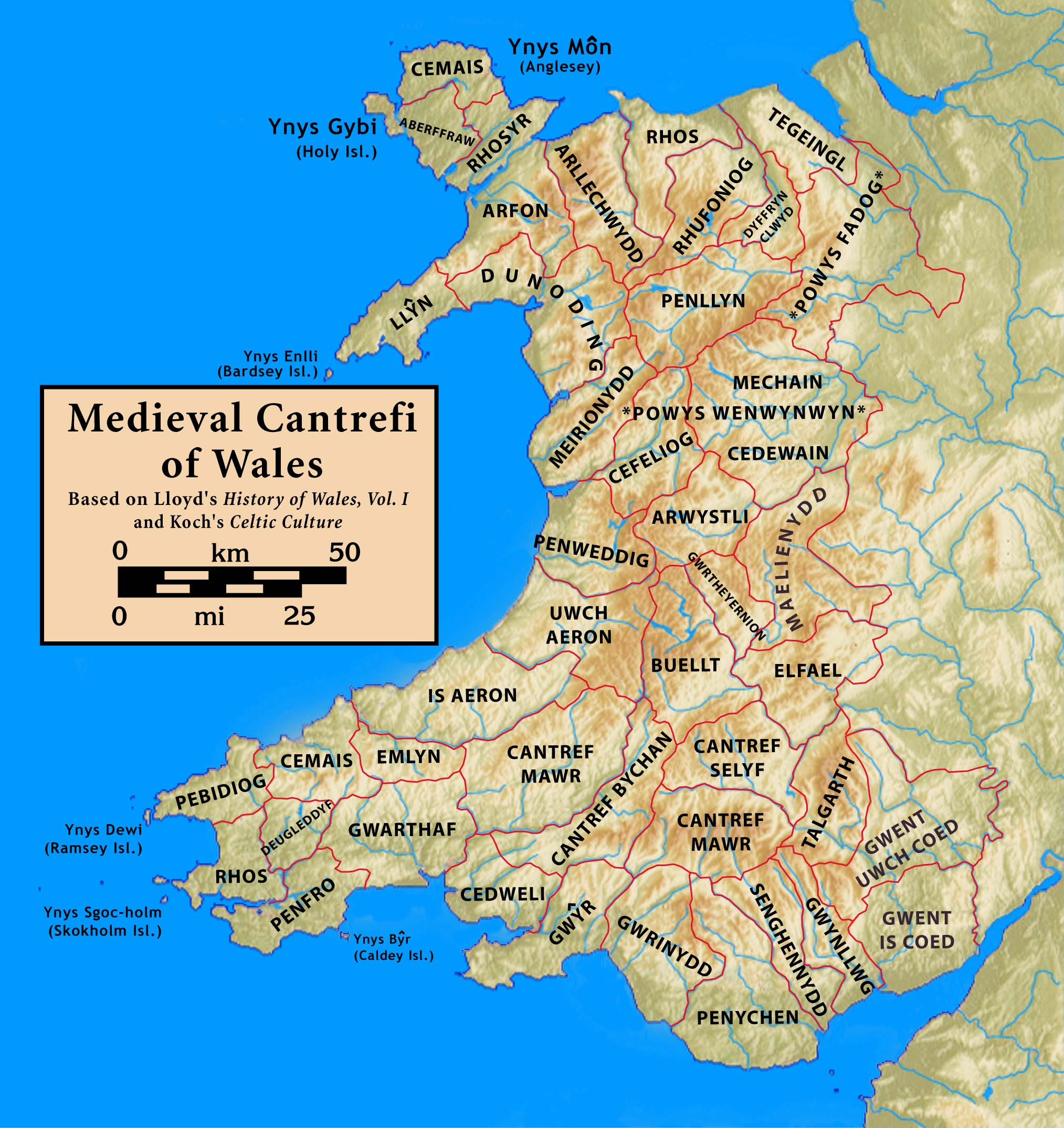
Map of Welsh cantrefs

Arllechwedd was an ancient Welsh cantref in north-west Wales. It was part of the kingdom of Gwynedd for much of its history until it was included in the new county of Caernarfonshire, together with Arfon and Llŷn under the terms of the Statute of Rhuddlan in 1284.

In the Middle Ages the Cantref Arllechwedd was one of the core territories of the Kingdom of Gwynedd and formed the entire west bank of the River Conwy. Within this cantref were found some of the most important civil, religious and military centres of that kingdom, including the palace of Abergwyngregyn, Dolwyddelan Castle and Aberconwy Abbey. Within Arllechwedd there were three divisions or cymydau, which were:

- Arllechwedd Uchaf (Upper Arllechwedd, bordering the sea to the north and the cantref of Arfon to the west)
- Arllechwedd Isaf (Lower Arllechwedd, also in the north of the cantref but on the river Conwy to the east)
- Nant Conwy (Conwy Mountain, the southern portion and greatest area of the cantref, west of the Conwy from Dolgarrog to its source)

Parishes and commotes of the cantref of Arllechwedd

Arllechwedd remains an ecclesiastical unit of the Church in Wales to this day. Most of the territory is now in Conwy County Borough and the western part lies in Gwynedd.
