= Gwynedd Is Conwy =

Welsh medieval region

Gwynedd Is Conwy (Welsh for 'Gwynedd Below the Conwy') was the portion of the former Kingdom of Gwynedd lying east of the River Conwy and west of River Dee. This area was also known as Y Berfeddwlad ('The Middle Land') as it lay between and was contested by the rival realms of Gwynedd and Powys. Today the area is mostly contained within the unitary authorities of Conwy, Denbighshire and Flintshire.
