= Cantiorix Inscription =

Stone grave marker in Wales

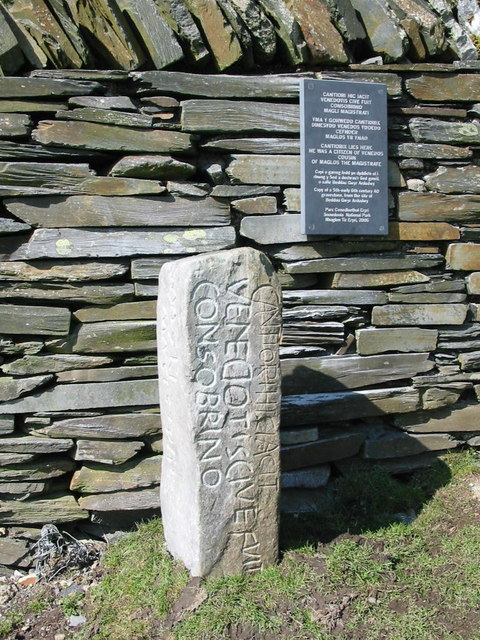
Replica of the Cantiorix inscription

The Cantiorix Inscription is a stone grave marker of the early post-Roman era found near Ffestiniog in north Wales and now at the church at Penmachno. It is notable for being the first known historical reference to the Kingdom of Gwynedd and for its use of the Roman terms for 'citizen' and 'magistrate'.

It is considered by some to be evidence that a Roman-style administration existed beyond the Roman departure from Britain in some form in the early Kingdom of Gwynedd, while others either question or discount its significance in that regard.

== Inscription ==
John Rhys had read the Latin text as "Cantiori Hic Jacit Venedotis Cive Fuit Consobrino Magli Magistrati" in his Lectures on Welsh Philology (1877), noting that "the person commemorated was a man of importance, and a Venedotian citizen, whatever that may exactly mean". Thomas Charles-Edwards was more precise in After Rome (2003), noting technical details such as an all-capitals text and the use of late spoken Latin (e.g., CIVE instead of the formally correct CIVIS) to date the inscription to the fifth or sixth century, and neither before nor after that. He translated the inscription as "Cantiori lies here; he was a citizen of Gwynedd, a cousin of Maglus the magistrate", adding his broader thesis that "As well as the language, the political discourse of the Empire survived".

== Background ==
The Cantiorix stone was found near Ffestiniog at the site traditionally known as the "Graves of the Men of Ardudwy" (Welsh: Beddau Gwŷr Ardudwy). The site has been destroyed over time, with little but the Roman road now visible. Antiquarian accounts include references to "likely long-cist graves marked by upright stones, suggesting a cemetery, as well as cairns, stones and other remains, which are thought to have included burial monuments of prehistoric date."

== Treatment by historians ==
The importance of the reference to early medieval Gwynedd is uncontested, but the implications of the inscription's use of the terms 'civis' and 'magistrate' is varied. Rhys expressed doubt as to the inscription's meaning of 'civis', while Charles-Edwards suggested that it was evidence of a Roman-style "political discourse" in early medieval northern Wales.

Lloyd in his History of Wales (1911) mentions the inscription stone at Penmachno as an early reference to Gwynedd (Venedotis being a genitive form of something like Venedas) in the sixth or seventh century and cites references, but does not comment upon it further. His discussion of "Wales Under Roman Rule" does not support any notion of a Roman heritage of administration or society, stating that Welsh society kept its native structure and connections to its pre-Roman past.

Wendy Davies in her Wales in the Early Middle Ages (1982) mentions the Cantiorix inscription parenthetically as part of a comment on people and communities. She says generally that there is very occasional mention of cives (citizens) as members of the community, and this single inscription is the only occurrence where it is mentioned in a context that specifies the size and nature of the community—a citizen of Gwynedd.

John Davies in his History of Wales (1990) mentions several of the inscription stones at Penmachno, noting the reference to a "citizen of Gwynedd", and relates them to a desire to cling to the Roman world, particularly regarding trade goods, but does not otherwise relate them to a survival of a Roman-originated administration.

Snyder, speaking of the Cantiorix inscription in his Age of Tyrants (1998), notes that the term magistratus is "otherwise unknown to British Christian epigraphy, though civic antecedents can be found on contemporary inscriptions from Gaul and the Mediterranean" and discusses several ancient usages of the term. He also notes authorities who had reached conclusions to the contrary, such as Alcock's belief that magistratus referred to one of the surviving civitates leaders to whom Honorius had sent his rescript in 410, and Nash-Williams' belief that the inscription was evidence of an ordered system of government in north Wales in the post-Roman era, centered upon Segontium. Snyder also questions the meaning of a "citizen of Venidos", saying that Gwynedd at this time was a region that would later become a kingdom, and was not a city.

Edwards in her Early-Medieval Inscribed Stones and Stone Sculpture in Wales (2001) notes that the inscription recalls terms of the Roman past and suggests possible context (e.g., the Roman custom of burials along roads), also noting that the inscription stone from Castell Dwyran in Carmarthenshire contains the word Protictoris, a title recalling a Roman past.
