= Dunoding =

Welsh medieval sub-kingdom

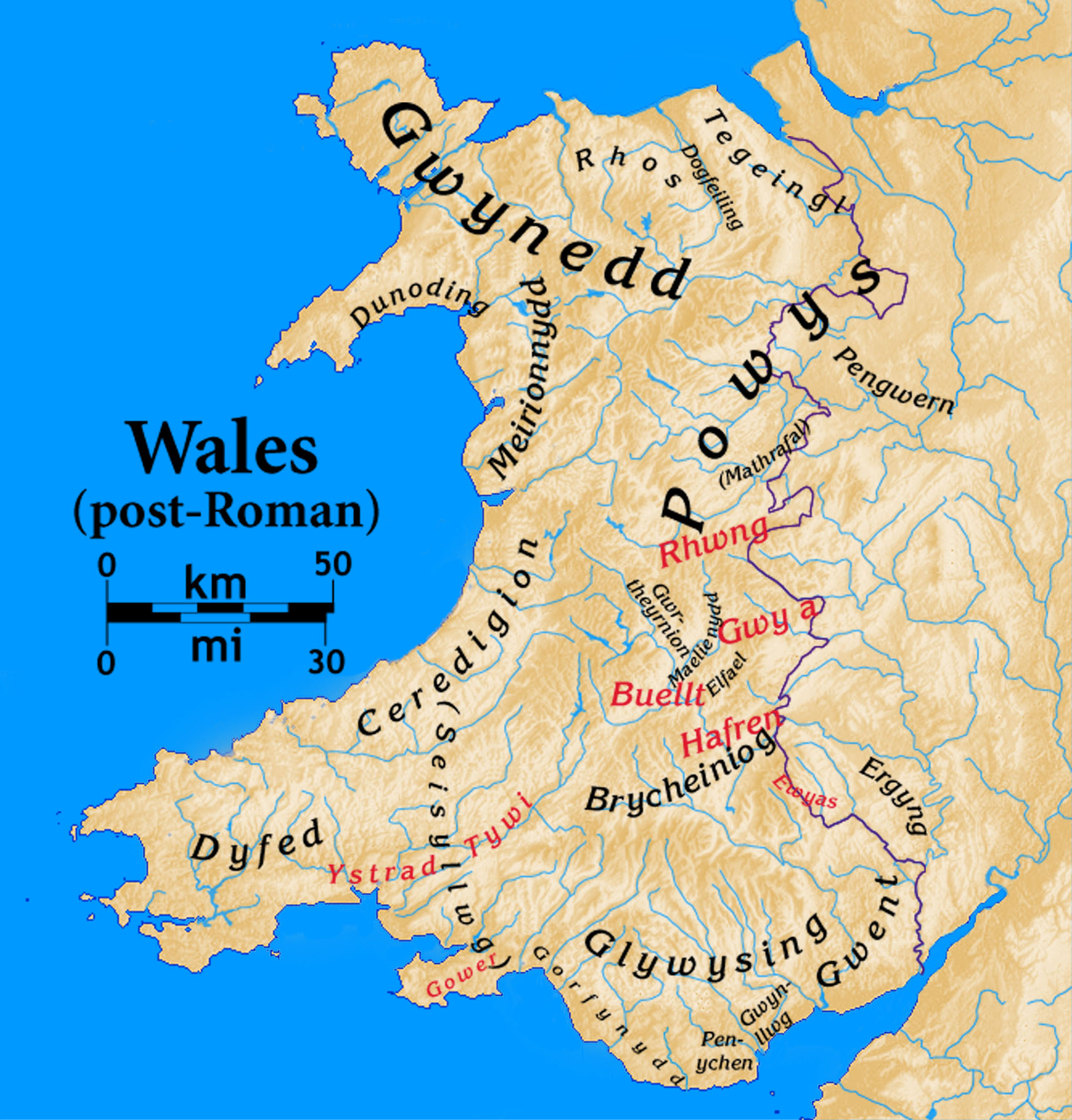
Post-Roman Welsh kingdoms. Dunoding is in the north-west, along the southern edge of the Llŷn Peninsula. The modern Anglo-Welsh border is also shown.

Dunoding was an early sub-kingdom within the Kingdom of Gwynedd in north-west Wales which existed between the 5th and 10th centuries. According to tradition, it was named after Dunod, a son of the founding father of Gwynedd – Cunedda Wledig – who drove the Irish settlers from the area in c. 460. The territory existed as a subordinate realm within Gwynedd until the line of rulers descended from Dunod expired in c. 925. Following the end of the House of Dunod, it was split into the cantrefi of Eifionydd and Ardudwy and fully incorporated into Gwynedd. After the defeat of the kingdom of Gwynedd in 1283 and its annexation to England, the two cantrefi became parts of the counties of Caernarfonshire and Merionethshire, respectively. It is now part of the modern county of Gwynedd.

== List of the rulers of Dunoding ==
Later medieval genealogical sources, which should be treated with some caution, list the following rulers of Dunoding:

1. Dunod ap Cunedda (from c. 450)
2. Eifion ap Dunod
3. Dingad ab Eifion
4. Meurig ap Dingad
5. Eifion ap Meurig
6. Isaac ab Eifion
7. Pobien Hen
8. Pobddelw ap Pobien
9. Eifion ap Pobddelw
10. Brochwel ab Eifion
11. Eigion ap Brochwel
12. Ieuanawl ab Eigion
13. Caradog ab Ieuanawl
14. Bleiddud ap Caradog
15. Cuhelyn ap Bleiddud (c. 860 – 925)
