= Llŷn (cantref) =

Welsh medieval cantref

Coordinates: 52.933°N 4.405°W

Llŷn was an ancient Welsh cantref in north-west Wales, covering the Lleyn Peninsula. It was part of the kingdom of Gwynedd for much of its history until it was included in the new county of Caernarfonshire, together with Arfon and Arllechwedd, under the terms of the Statute of Rhuddlan in 1284.

Trahain Goch ap Madoc, died 1325, was described as "of Llŷn".

Llyn Cantref, parishes and its three commotes
