= Brinkburn Priory =

Former monastery in Northumberland, England

- Brinkburn Priory. The church is to the right and the manor house to the left.

- Location in Northumberland
- 55.279°N 1.817°W
- Location: Northumberland, England
- OS grid reference: NZ117982

History
- Founded: c. 1135
- Built for: Augustinian Order

Site notes
- Architectural styles: Transitional between Romanesque and Gothic
- Restored: 1858–1868
- Governing body: English Heritage

Scheduled monument
- Official name: Brinkburn Priory Augustinian priory, mill, gateway and post-Dissolution house
- Designated: 8 December 1958
- Reference no.: 1007508

Listed Building – Grade I
- Official name: The Priory Church, Brinkburn
- Designated: 21 October 1953
- Reference no.: 1303969

Listed Building – Grade II*
- Official name: The Manor House, Brinkburn
- Designated: 12 October 1952
- Reference no.: 1303922

Brinkburn Priory is a former monastery built, starting in the 12th century, on a bend of the River Coquet, about 4 miles (6 km) east of Rothbury, Northumberland, England.

The priory church survived the dissolution of the monasteries because it was also a parish church. After decline in the post-dissolution centuries the church was restored in the 19th century. It is a grade I listed building in the care of English Heritage. Little survives of the other monastic structures, on the site of which a manor house, just south of the church, now stands.

== Early history ==
Brinkburn was founded by William Bertram, Baron of Mitford, in the reign of Henry I as an Augustinian priory. The exact date is not known but cannot have been later than 1135, as Henry died that year. About 1180 or so, Brinkburn became an independent house, and the building of the monastic church was commenced. The architectural style has been described as "transitional" (i.e. between Norman and Gothic).

Although the Priory acquired lands in Northumberland and Durham over the years it was never particularly wealthy. Little is known of the early history of the priory, although it is known that it survived some difficult times. In fact, as late as 1419 it was raided and robbed.

In late November 1515 Margaret Tudor, Queen of Scots, spent a week at the Priory convalescing after the birth of her daughter Lady Margaret Douglas.

== Dissolution ==
Brinkburn Priory was dissolved in 1536 after Parliament enacted the Dissolution of the Lesser Monasteries Act. The "lesser monasteries" were those with an income of less than £200 per annum, and Brinkburn fell into this category as in 1535 the priory's value had been recorded as £69 in the Valor Ecclesiasticus. After the dissolution the estate was mainly owned by the Fenwick family, and in the late 16th century they built a manor house just south of the priory church, on the site of some of the other priory buildings.

Services continued to be held at Brinkburn, and the church was retained in a fair state of repair till the end of the 16th century. In 1602 it was reported to be in a state of decay, and at some point before 1700 the roof collapsed and regular services were abandoned.

== Modern history ==
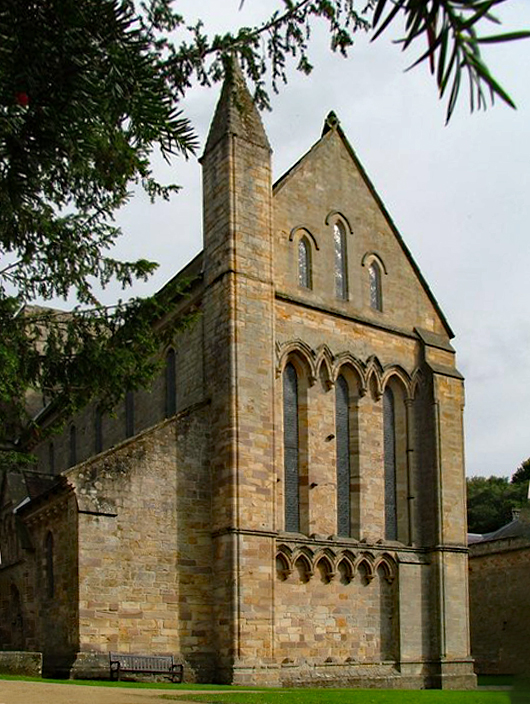
West elevation of church

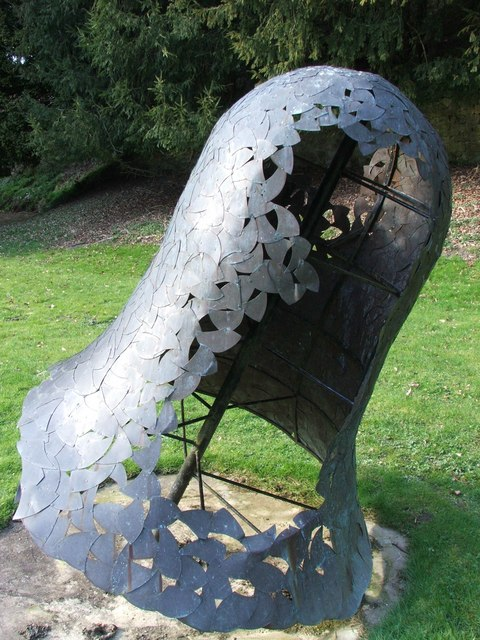
Brinkburn Bell.

=== Church ===
In the 1750s Thomas Sharp, Archdeacon of Northumberland, tried to effect repairs to the ruin. Although there was considerable support for the project, work was called off after a dispute between the owner William Fenwick and the Vicar of Felton.

In the 19th century the Cadogan family, owners of Brinkburn, revived the plans for the restoration of the church and work began in 1858. The roof was completed in the space of a year, and the stained glass windows had been inserted by 1864. The church, however, was not furnished until 1868. Brinkburn Priory today is a sympathetic 19th-century restoration of the mediæval original.

The tombstone of Prior William, Bishop of Durham (died 1484) was found during the reconstruction, as was the original altar stone with five crosses. The latter is still preserved along with an ancient font.

Religious services are still occasionally held here. It has also been a venue for concerts, notably the Brinkburn Festival directed by Paul McCreesh, which scheduled its concerts to avoid disturbing local bat populations (myotis daubentoni and others).

=== Other buildings ===
The manor house, which utilises part of the vaulted undercroft to the monks' dining hall, presents a nineteenth-century appearance. It is a grade II* listed building.

Brinkburn Mill, once part of the Priory precinct, was rebuilt in the nineteenth century. It was refurbished in 1990 by the Landmark Trust.

== The site today ==
The principal survival of the medieval priory is the large late 12th-century church. It consists of a nave and north aisle of six bays, a crossing with a low tower, transepts of two bays with vaulted eastern chapels, and a three-bay aisleless chancel. Except for the south-west corner, which was rebuilt in 1858, the masonry of the church has survived from the original construction. While the north door is in elaborate late Romanesque style, most of the ornament is refined, in the manner of contemporary work at Hexham Priory and Byland Abbey, freely mixing rounded and pointed arches. The use of stone vaulting and the three-storey elevation mark the church out as a high-status building.

The remains of the domestic buildings are much less extensive. They formerly stood round a cloister to the south of the church. Adjoining the south transept are the ruins of the slype, a vaulted passage leading to the canons' cemetery. Of the south range the vaulted undercroft to the refectory now supports the post-Reformation manor house, externally now Gothick and neo-Tudor work of 1810 and 1830–37. The interior has been heavily altered, but still retains the medieval lavatorium and nineteenth century plasterwork and an iron staircase. Nothing survives of the west range, if indeed one existed.

The church and cloister stood within an extensive walled precinct which contained the buildings needed to sustain a monastic community. Except for some fragments of the mill incorporated in the 18th-19th century structure east of the church, these have vanished above ground, leaving the precinct as a wooded area. Parts of the precinct wall and gateway also survive. Of the post-medieval alterations to the precinct, a cartshed and other outbuildings survive attached to the mill, while there is a stable-block of c.1810 to the west. More enigmatic is a tunnel of c.1800 east of the church, likely a grotto or folly.

== In popular culture ==
The church was used for the scenes of Edmund Blackadder's consecration at Canterbury Cathedral in the episode "The Archbishop" of the first series of Blackadder in 1983.

== See also ==
- The Devil's Causeway, which passes the priory less than 1 mile (2 km) to the east (where it crosses the River Coquet). The causeway is a Roman road which starts at Portgate on Hadrian's Wall, north of Corbridge, and extends 55 miles (89 km) northwards across Northumberland to the mouth of the River Tweed at Berwick-upon-Tweed.
- List of English abbeys, priories and friaries serving as parish churches
