= Beamsley =

Village and civil parish in North Yorkshire, England

Coordinates: 53.967710°N 1.882820°W

- Location within North Yorkshire
- Population: 139 (2011 census)
- OS grid reference: SE077524
- Civil parish: Beamsley
- Unitary authority: North Yorkshire
- Ceremonial county: North Yorkshire
- Region: Yorkshire and the Humber
- Country: England
- Sovereign state: United Kingdom
- Post town: SKIPTON
- Postcode district: BD23
- Police: North Yorkshire
- Fire: North Yorkshire
- Ambulance: Yorkshire

Beamsley is a village and civil parish in the county of North Yorkshire, England. It is just within the boundary of the Yorkshire Dales National Park, and about six miles east of Skipton and two miles north of Addingham. The village lies immediately south of the A59 road and on the eastern bank of the River Wharfe. The name Beamsley derives from the Old English beðmelēah meaning 'wood or clearing at the valley bottom.

According to the 2001 census, the parish had a population of 149, reducing to 139 at the 2011 Census. The parish is bordered by West Yorkshire to the south.

Until 1974 it was part of the West Riding of Yorkshire. From 1974 to 2023 it was part of the Craven District, it is now administered by the unitary North Yorkshire Council.

The former Beamsley Methodist Church has been carefully modified, by the Beamsley Project Charitable Trust, to become a self-catering holiday centre for people with disabilities. The quiet roads around Beamsley make it a popular destination with cyclists with the Tour de France Grand Départ 2014 passing through the local area close to Beamsley.

On the other side of the A59 to Beamsley village is the site of Beamsley Hospital. This building was noted for its odd design of seven rooms radiating out from a central area. This meant that to go to a room you had to pass through a chapel which was an encouragement to prayer. The hospital is now managed by the Landmark Trust as self-catering accommodation.

Beamsley Beacon (also known as Howber Hill) is east of the village and rises to 390.7 metres (1,282 ft) above sea level. The Beacon is notable for its stone cairns, one of which is supposedly there to mark the burial site of a chieftain from the Bronze Age. Stones on the beacon were also used to construct a guard hut during the Napoleonic Wars.

J. M. W. Turner painted a shooting party on Beamsley Beacon in 1816.

In 2015, a memorial was unveiled to the Royal Canadian Air Force aircrew who died when their Lancaster Bomber crashed into the beacon. Four of the crew died and four survived. The bomber was flying out of RAF Leeming in North Yorkshire when it crashed in fog around midday on 5 November 1945.

Although small, Base 3 Systems, an analytics consultancy and N.Peal, a luxury cashmere designer, have head offices in the village.

J. M. W. Turner's 1816 painting Grouse Shooting on Beamsley Beacon.

== Notable residents ==
- Christopher Clapham (1608–1686), MP

== See also ==
- Listed buildings in Beamsley
