= Beamsley Hospital =

Grade I listed almshouse near Skipton, North Yorkshire

Coordinates: 53.97381°N 1.87603°W

- Landmark Trust
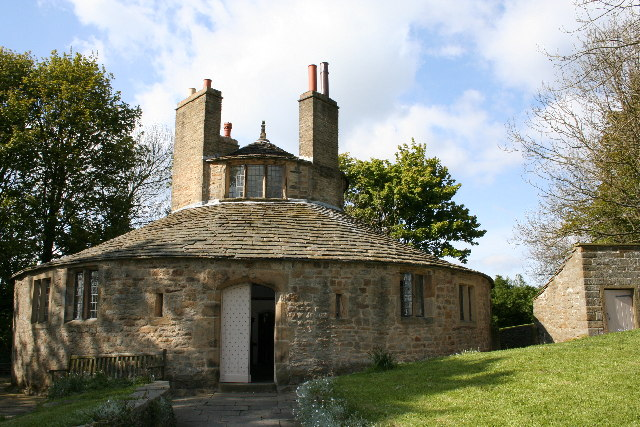

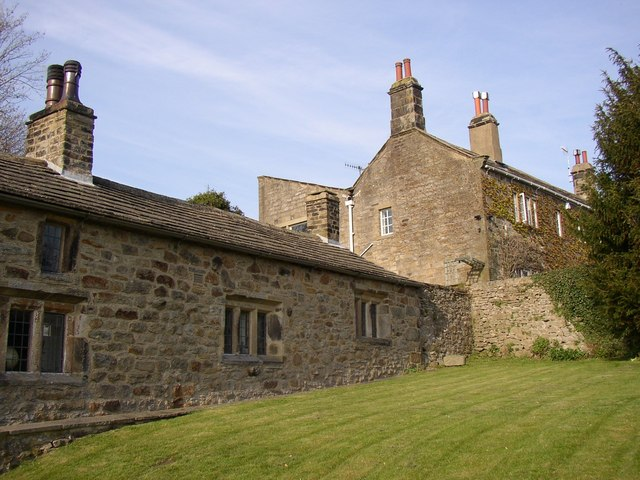
- Almshouses

Geography
- Location: Skipton, North Yorkshire, England

Organisation
- Patron: Lady Margaret Russell

Services
- Emergency department: No

History
- Founded: 1593
- Closed: 1970s

Links
- Lists: Hospitals in England

Listed Building – Grade I
- Official name: Beamsley Hospital (North Range)
- Designated: 10 September 1954
- Part of: Beamsley Hospital
- Reference no.: 1131765

Listed Building – Grade II*
- Official name: Beamsley Hospital (South Range)
- Designated: 10 September 1954
- Part of: Beamsley Hospital
- Reference no.: 1166620

Beamsley Hospital is an almshouse building at Beamsley, near Skipton in North Yorkshire, and founded in 1593 by the Lady Margaret Russell, the Countess of Cumberland. She had originally intended for the construction of accommodation for 13 poor widows, a Mother and 12 Sisters, but by her death in 1616 only the hospital and chapel building had been completed. Her daughter, Lady Anne Clifford, added the front range which provided accommodation for local widows of little means.

The north range hospital and chapel building is circular in plan and is constructed as two stone drums, one inside the other, the inner drum rises through the roof of the main building, and contains windows that provides daylight into a chapel that lies within the heart of the building. Around the perimeter there was originally accommodation for a Mother and six Sisters. The nearby south range almhouses block is built in two storeys with a seven bay frontage with three one storey units at one end.

The buildings remained in use until the 1970s, after which point the Hospital Trustees passed the property to the Landmark Trust in 1983, which has restored and preserved the buildings and made them available as historical holiday accommodation.

The north wing of the complex is Grade I listed and the south wing listed Grade II*.

== See also ==
- Grade I listed buildings in North Yorkshire (district)
- Listed buildings in Beamsley
