= Coombe, Morwenstow =

Hamlet in Cornwall, England

Coordinates: 50.8776°N 4.5476°W

Coombe: Cornish: Komm
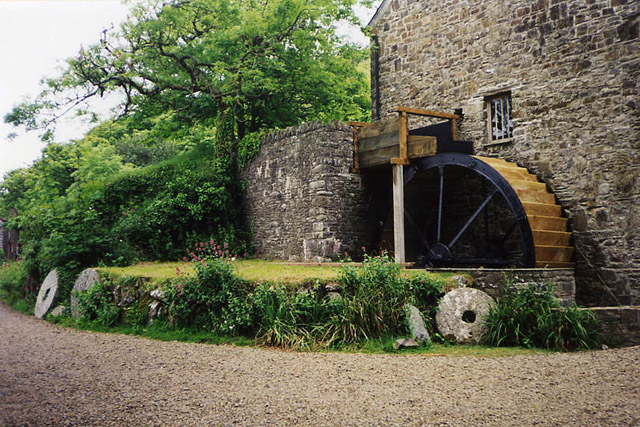
- Coombe Mill

- Location within Cornwall
- OS grid reference: SS209118
- Civil parish: Morwenstow
- Unitary authority: Cornwall
- Ceremonial county: Cornwall
- Region: South West
- Country: England
- Sovereign state: United Kingdom
- Post town: BUDE
- Postcode district: EX23
- Dialling code: 01288
- Police: Devon and Cornwall
- Fire: Cornwall
- Ambulance: South Western
- UK Parliament: North Cornwall

Coombe (Cornish: Komm) is a hamlet in northeast Cornwall, England, United Kingdom.

Combe is situated in the civil parish of Morwenstow three miles (5 km) north of Bude. Most houses in the settlement are owned by the Landmark Trust.

Combe lies within the Cornwall Area of Outstanding Natural Beauty (AONB). Almost a third of Cornwall has AONB designation, with the same status and protection as a National Park.

== Coombe Mill ==
Coombe Mill, a disused mill built on four levels, lies at the bottom of Coombe Valley. It is a Site of Special Scientific Interest, noted for its various species of bat that inhabit the mill's buildings.
