= Plas Uchaf =

Hall house in Denbighshire, Wales

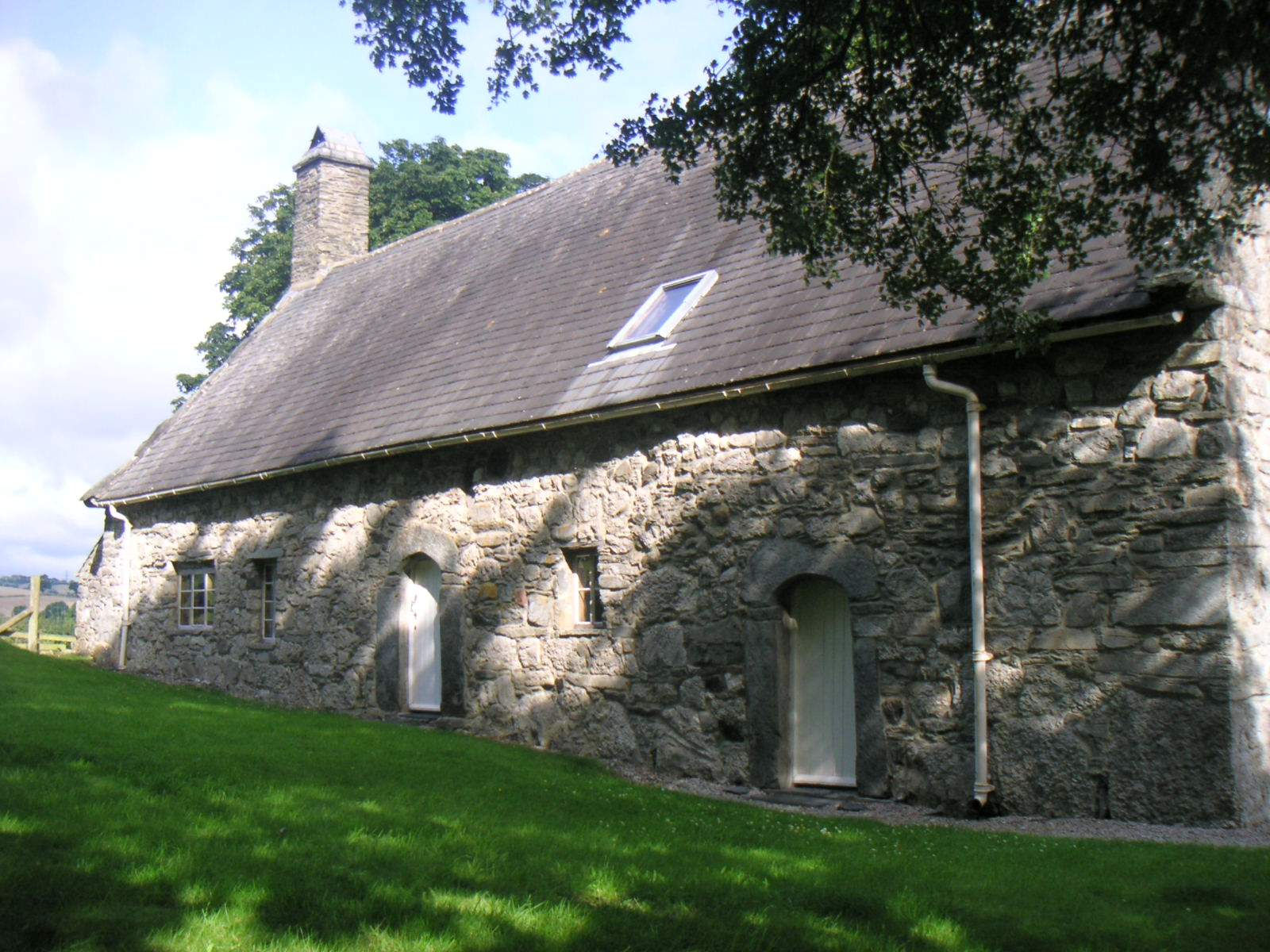
- Interactive map of the Plas Uchaf area

General information
- Location: Corwen, Wales
- Coordinates: 52.9734°N 3.4114°W
- Completed: 15th century

Plas Uchaf (Welsh for 'upper hall') is a 15th-century cruck-and-aisle-truss hall house, 1.5 miles (2.4 km) south-west of Corwen, Denbighshire, Wales and 1 mile (1.6 km) north of Cynwyd. Its excellent workmanship indicates a house originally of considerable importance; it has been described as "of palatial significance".

== Construction ==
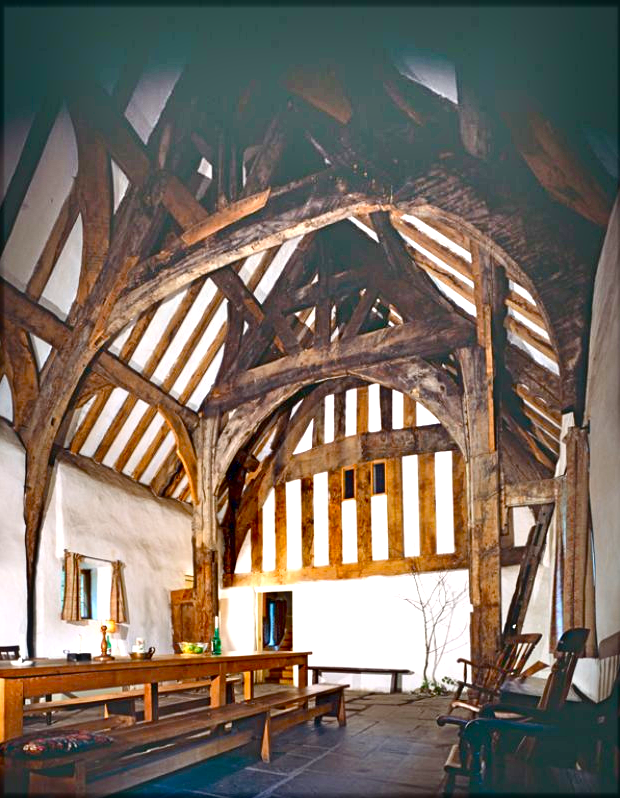
Interior of Plas Uchaf, Corwen

The house consists of a long rectangle divided by a cross passage. The west end is a large hall some 25 feet (7.6 m) high. The east end consists of smaller rooms on two floors. The roof structure is substantial, of paired cruck beams with additional horizontal, vertical and diagonal bracing. One unusual feature is that the truss between the cross-passage and hall is an aisle truss, a form normally only found in much larger buildings such as barns and churches. This suggests the use of English craftsmen and is an indication of the status of the original inhabitants.

The walls are of stone rubble but were originally half-timbered.

== Early history ==
The early history of the building is not documented. The original construction was thought to date from the late 14th or early 15th century, but part of the structure has been dated to 1435 by tree-ring dating. This is thought to be consistent with its use as the seat of the barons of Cymmer-yn-Edeirnion.

In the 16th century the hall was divided horizontally by the addition of an inserted floor supported by moulded cross beams.

== Decline and restoration ==
The house was listed as a house of the gentry as late as 1707 but was later split into two or three labourers' cottages. The house was occupied until at least 1933.

Plas Uchaf was listed Grade I in 1952.

However, by 1964 the building had been abandoned. The inserted floor and panelling had been removed, and the structure was falling into ruin. Peter Smith and Ffrangcon Lloyd drew attention to the building in 1964, and it was eventually taken on and restored by the Landmark Trust.

The building is now maintained using income from its use as holiday accommodation.
