= N.Peal =

British clothing brand

N. PEAL (RETAIL) LIMITED

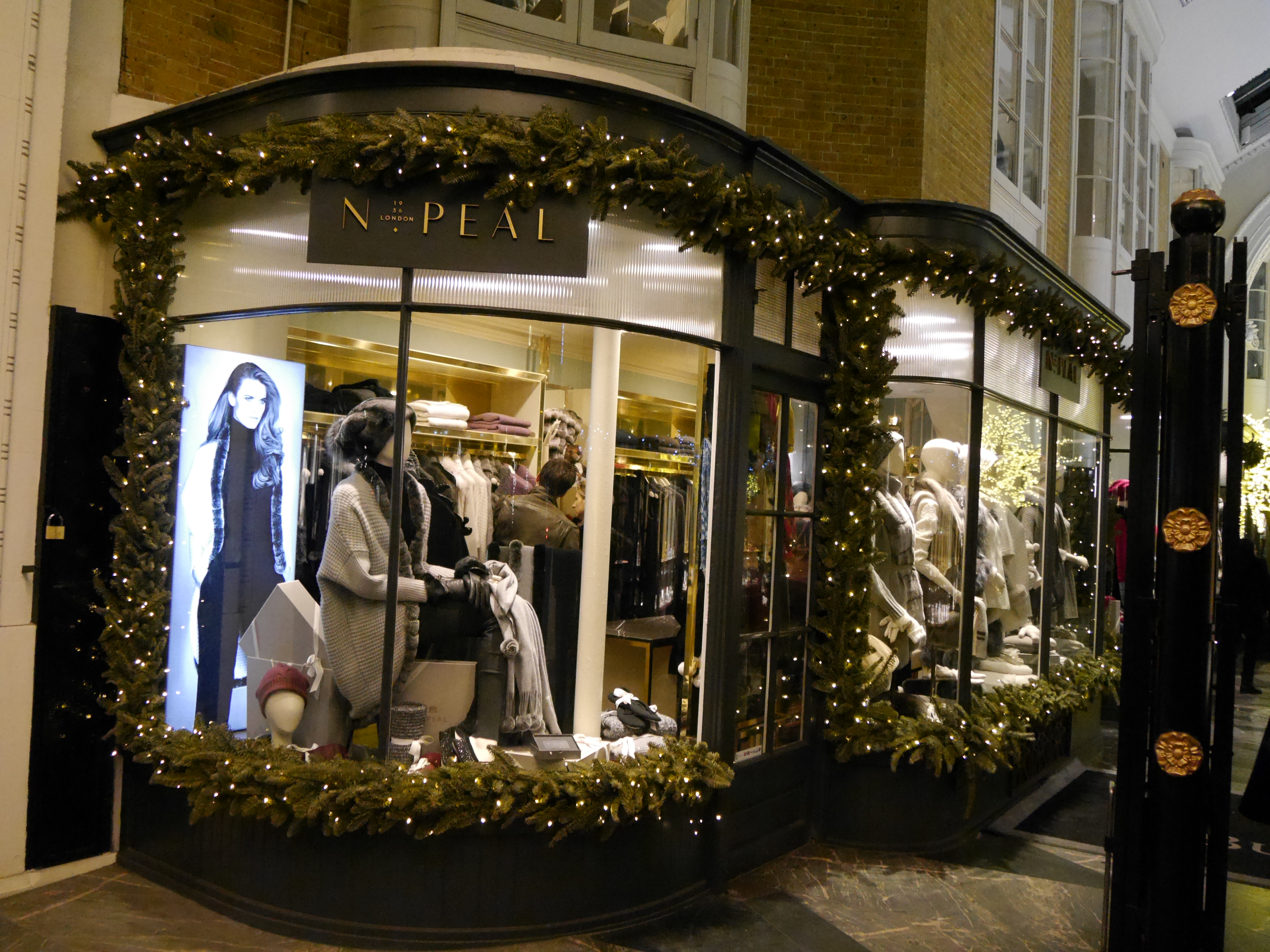
- Trade name: N. Peal
- Type: Private
- Industry: Apparel
- Founded: 1936, London
- Key people: Adam Holdsworth CEO
- Owner: Adam Holdsworth
- Website: https://www.npeal.com/

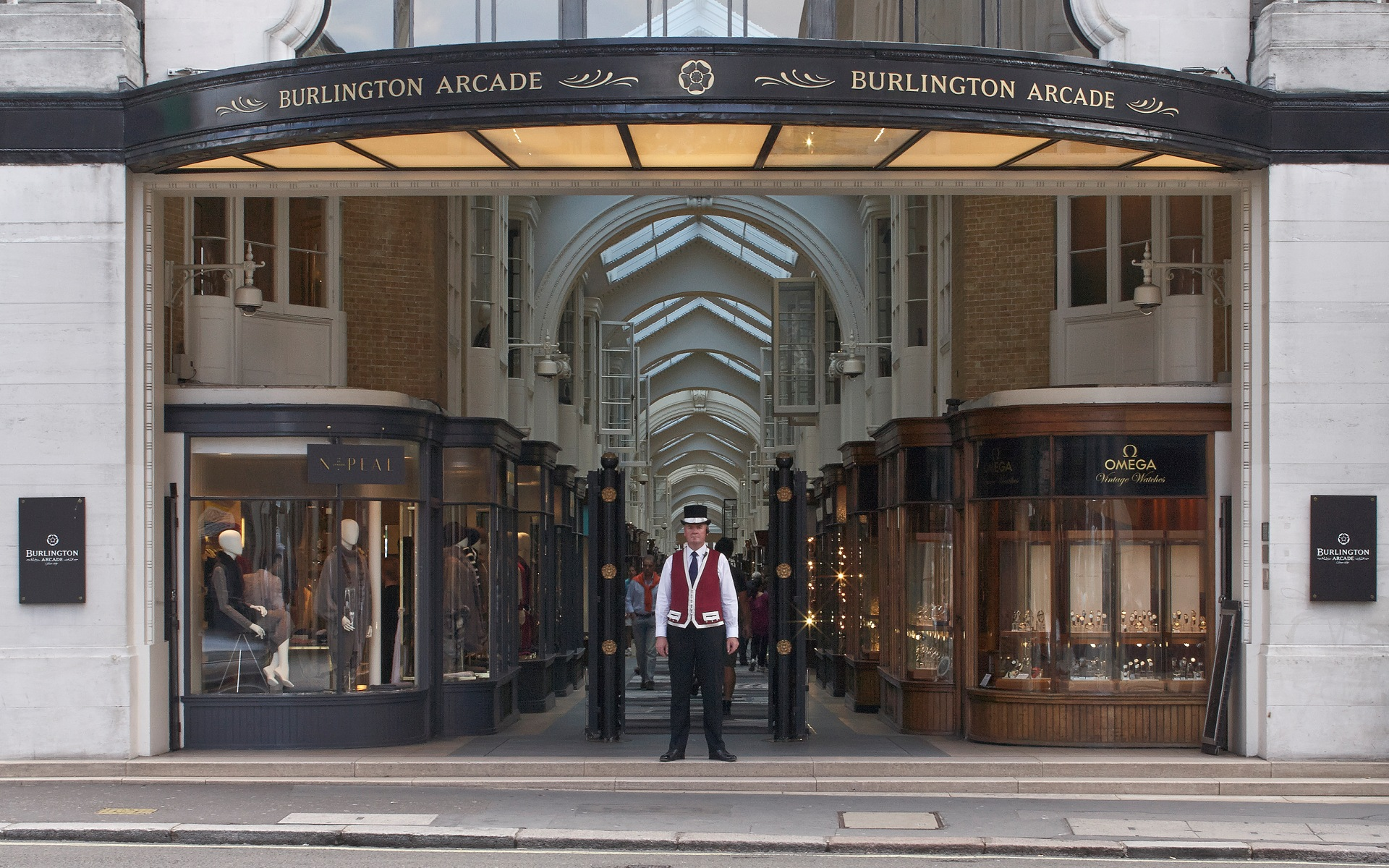
N.Peal opened its flagship store in the famous Burlington Arcade in 1936.

N.Peal is a luxury British cashmere knitwear and accessories brand founded in London by Nat Peal in 1936. After the brand's decline and "substantial losses" through the 1990s and early 2000s, the original company ceased operations in 2006, and then-owner Chuck Feeney sold its component parts. The N. Peal name was purchased by Adam Holdsworth, who operates it with a Head Office in Beamsley, North Yorkshire, a design team in London, and vertically integrated production “from goat to garment” in Mongolia and China.

== History ==
=== 1936–1945 – The Beginning ===
The first N.Peal store was opened as a men's haberdashery in London's Burlington Arcade in Mayfair by businessman Nat Peal in March 1936. Peal's real name was Leapman; the first part of his name was transposed to sound more traditionally ‘British’.

When World War II broke out in 1939, Peal was stationed in the Shetland Islands. During this time he supplied his store with sweaters woven directly from the wool of Shetland sheep. As wool was being rationed during wartime, Peal was able to harness the demand for knitwear in Britain.

=== 1945–1950s – After the War ===
When peacetime was restored, Peal returned to London and reinstated cashmere wool as the principal material in his knitwear. Peal began to make annual trips to New York and Boston to grow his business in the United States of America.

=== 1980s-2006 ===
By the mid-1980s, the N. Peal company had been acquired by wealthy businessman and philanthropist Chuck Feeney. In 1990, it opened a factory in a historic Hawick building, but the brand's declining fortunes lead to its closure in 2006. The building has remained abandoned since; it was C-listed by Historic Environment Scotland in 2007 and has been considered "at risk" since 2011.

=== 2007 – Change of Ownership ===
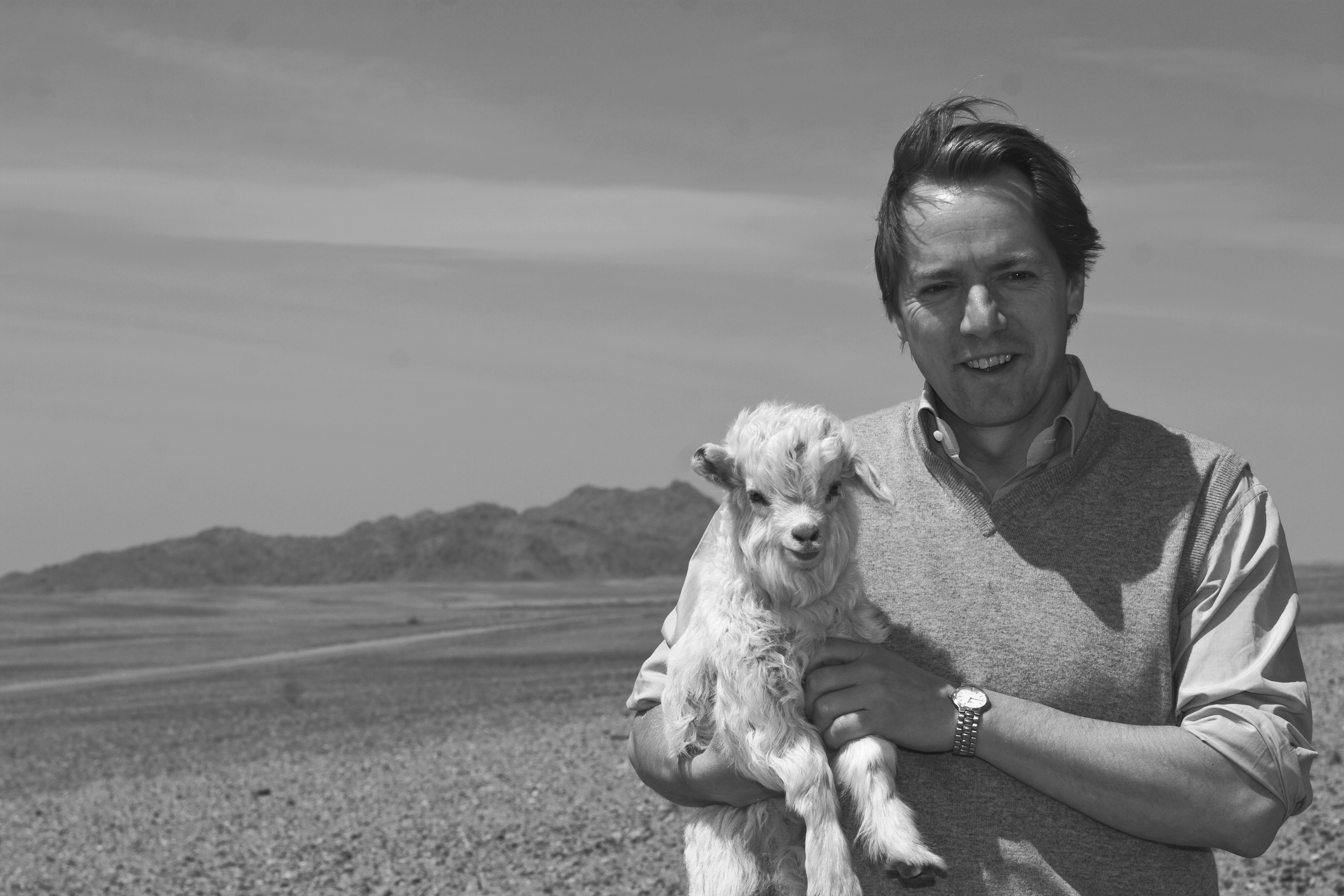
Adam Holdsworth, owner of N.Peal, holding a Mongolian cashmere goat

Ilkley businessman Adam Holdsworth purchased the N.Peal brand from Feeney in 2007. At the time, Managing Director Holdsworth had little experience in luxury retail, but more than 25 years of experience in cashmere manufacture. Rather than restart the Hawick factory, Holdsworth began production in Mongolia and China, citing improved transparency and control over the supply chain, and increased value to customers. By the next year, he was able to renovate, reopen, and expand the Burlington Arcade store, retaining some original staff.

=== 2010s - Revitalization, Expansion, and Association With James Bond ===
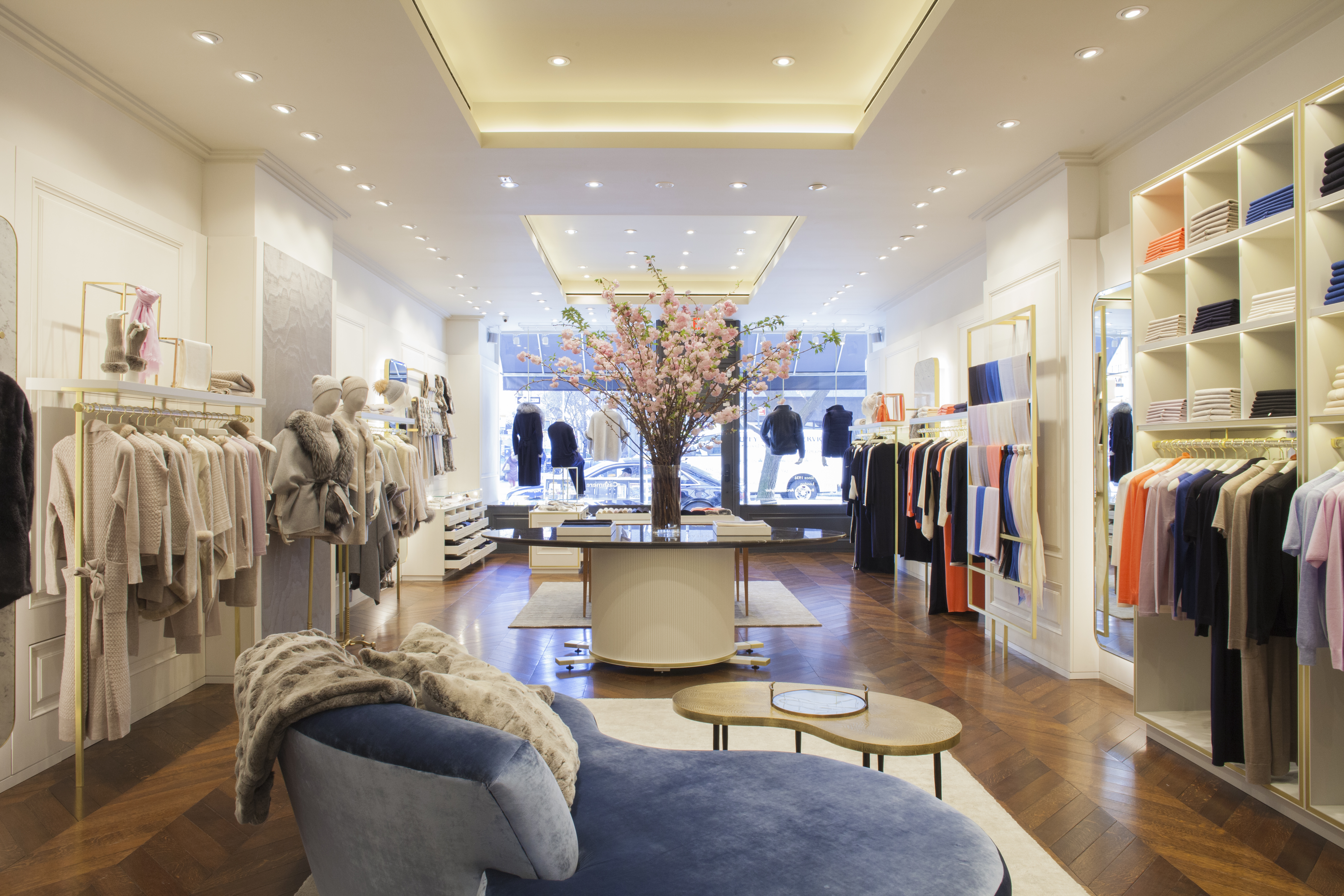
A look into N.Peal's Madison Avenue Store, New York

The N.Peal flagship store in Burlington Arcade received a full refurbishment in 2013, with a concept taken from the clean refinement of those original Deco years where the greens were minty and the typography was curved. The result was a store that echoed the early days but also felt appropriately modern. N.Peal opened its first US store in 2018, on Madison Avenue in New York City.

Movie stylists selected a "lapis blue" N. Peal sweater for Daniel Craig to wear as James Bond in the 2012 film Skyfall. The association continued with custom-designed pieces for Spectre and No Time to Die. Posters (and for a time, billboards) for Spectre featured Bond wearing Peal sweaters.

== Stores ==
N.Peal has five stores in London: the flagship store in the Burlington Arcade since 1936, and others that are located in Knightsbridge, Covent Garden, Brook Street, and St. James Piccadilly. It also maintains a store on Madison Avenue, in New York City. The N.Peal Head Office is in Beamsley, North Yorkshire.
