= Lowsonford =

Village in Warwickshire, England

Coordinates: 52.30890°N 1.72714°W

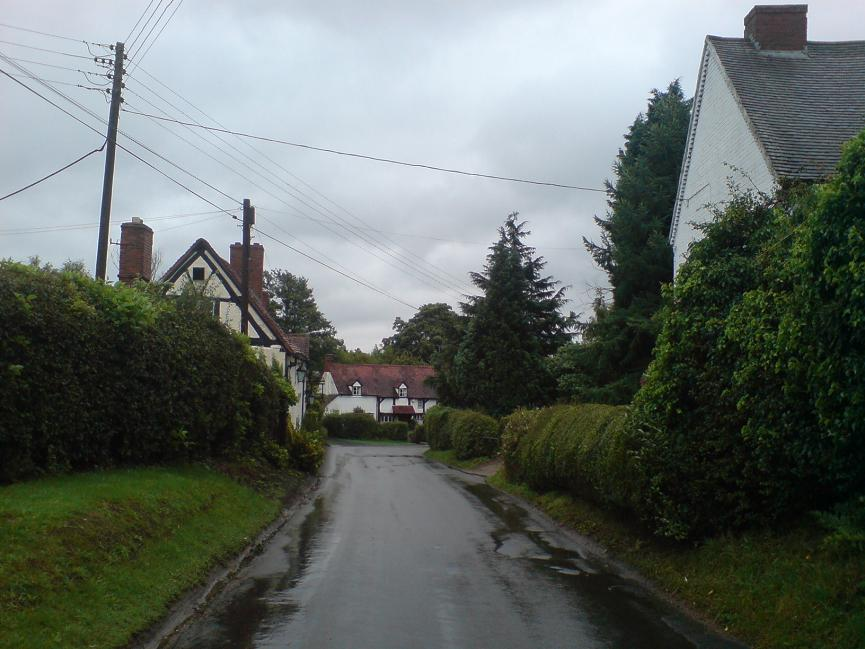

Lowsonford is a small village within the parish of Rowington in Warwickshire, England. The village lies 4 miles (6.4 km) north-east of Henley-in-Arden.

== General information ==
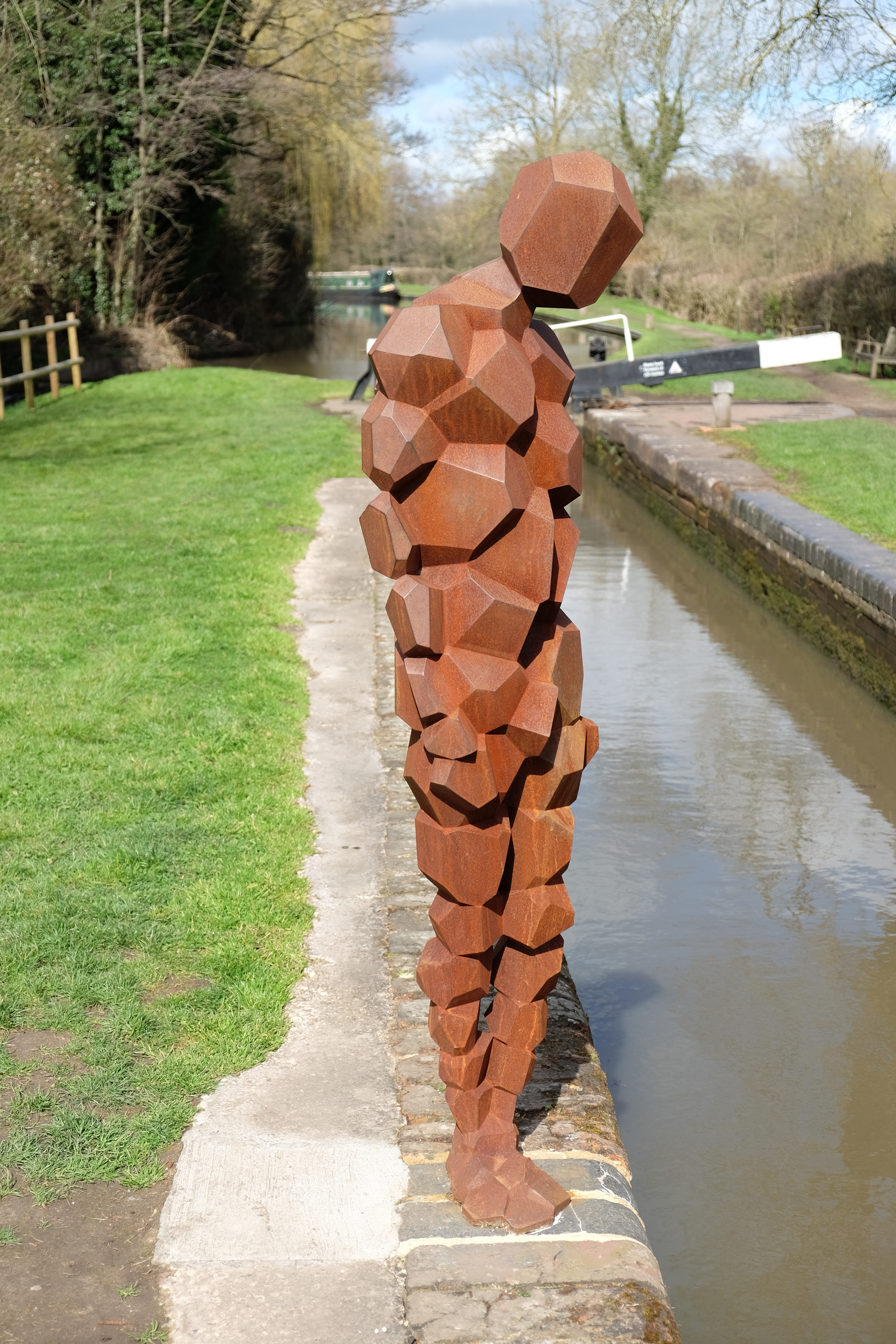
Land by Antony Gormley

The most famous of Lowsonford's buildings is the "Fleur de Lys" pub which is known for its meat pies. Every two years there is a Village Show(previously known as the Flower Show) which is run jointly with the neighbouring settlement of Rowington which hosts the show in the other years. In May 2015, an Antony Gormley statue of an iron man was placed by the canal lock here. The statue was one of five life-sized sculptures, known as Land, that were placed near the centre and at four compass points of the United Kingdom in a commission by the Landmark Trust to celebrate its 50th anniversary. It was removed in May 2016.

== Geography ==
The Stratford-upon-Avon Canal runs through Lowsonford, and there are several locks.

== History ==
The village hall was built in 1936 and its main room can seat 75 people. The village church is dedicated to St Luke. In 2019, the Daily Mirror identified the B95 postcode, which covers Lowsonford, as having been the United Kingdom's burglary hotspot in 2018. The study however was based on number of claims made per thousand insurance policies rather than total number of burglaries or percentage of households burgled.
