= James Blyth, Baron Blyth of Rowington =

British businessman (born 1940)

The Right Honourable The Lord Blyth of Rowington Kt

Member of the House of Lords
- Lord Temporal
- Life peerage 24 July 1995 – 1 January 2018

Personal details
- Born: James Blyth; 8 May 1940 (age 86)
- Party: Conservative
- Spouse: Pamela Anne Campbell-Dixon
- Children: 2
- Education: Spier's School; University of Glasgow (MA)

James Blyth, Baron Blyth of Rowington (born 8 May 1940) is a British businessman.

== Early life ==
The son of Daniel Blyth and Jane Power Carlton, Blyth was educated at Spier's School, Beith, and the University of Glasgow, where he graduated with a Bachelor of Arts and a Master of Arts in history in 1963.

== Career ==
Blyth worked for Mobil Oil from 1963 to 1969, for General Foods from 1969 to 1971 and for Mars Foods from 1971 to 1974. Between 1974 and 1977, he was general manager of Lucas Batteries and between 1977 and 1981 general manager of Lucas Aerospace. He was also director of the Imperial Group from 1984 to 1986, managing director of Plessey Electronic Systems in 1985 and 1986, and managing director of the Plessey Company in 1986 and 1987. Blyth was a director of Cadbury-Schweppes between 1986 and 1990, of British Aerospace between 1990 and 1994, and of NatWest between 1998 and 2000.

In 1981, Blyth became head of defence sales for the Ministry of Defence, a post he held until 1985, when he was knighted. From 1987 to 1996, he was a chairman of the London Business School (LBS), and to 1998 director and chief executive of The Boots Company. On 24 July 1995, he was created a life peer as Baron Blyth of Rowington, of Rowington in the County of Warwickshire. He sat as a Conservative in the House of Lords until his retirement on 1 January 2018.

Blyth received an honorary doctorate from the University of Nottingham in 1992. He is a Fellow of the Royal Aeronautical Society, appointed in 1994, and a Fellow of the London Business School, appointed in 1998.

He was chairman of Diageo, parent company of the Popov and Smirnoff brands of vodka, as well as Guinness malt beverages, until June 2008. He was succeeded by Franz Humer. In 2013, he was appointed to the board of Avoca Capital Holdings.

== Personal life ==
Blyth has been married to Pamela Anne Campbell-Dixon since 1967; they have one daughter and one deceased son.

== Arms ==
Coat of arms of James Blyth, Baron Blyth of Rowington
Coronet A Coronet of a Baron Crest [Upon a Helm with a Wreath Argent and Gules] out of an Eastern Crown Gules a Dexter Arm embowed in Armour the Hand gauntleted proper grasping by its blade a Sword pointing downwards all Argent and holding to the blade by its stalk leaved Vert a Double Rose Argent upon Gules barbed and seeded proper Escutcheon Gyronny of twelve Gules and Argent a Horse rampant Sable langued Gules Supporters On either side a Unicorn reguardant Argent armed and unguled Or in the mouth a Double Rose Argent upon Gules barbed seeded and leaved proper Motto Quod Verum Tutum (What is safe is true)

== Notes ==
Orders of precedence in the United Kingdom
Preceded by The Lord Hope of Craighead	Gentlemen; Baron Blyth of Rowington	Followed by The Lord Winston
