= Brinkburn Mill =

Historic water mill in Northumberland, England

Coordinates: 55°16′43″N 1°49′01″W

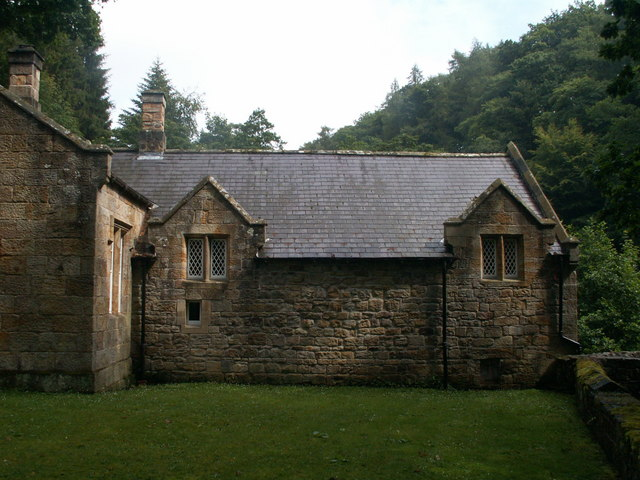
Brinkburn Mill

Brinkburn Mill is a water mill located near Rothbury, in Northumberland. It once formed part of the precincts of Brinkburn Priory and was constructed in around 1800 on the site of a former medieval mill. After the dissolution of the monasteries, the priory, and its mill, were owned by Fenwicks of Northumberland until 1792, when the priory was sold to Joseph Hetherington. It was inherited by his niece and her husband, Major Richard Hodgson, in 1809, and the mill appears to have been rebuilt, along with Brinkburn House, shortly thereafter.

The mill appears in a painting by J. M. W. Turner in about 1830, depicted as tumble-down building with a thatched roof. By 1860 the mill had been extended and re-roofed, and partly restyled to appear more attractive as viewed from the house. By 1896 the northern part of the mill had been turned into a small cottage, and by 1920 the mill itself had fallen out of use. The water wheel was used to power an electric generator for a while in the 1930s, before the building fell empty for a number of years. The Landmark Trust bought the mill in 1990 and undertook a full restoration so that it is available to rent as holiday accommodation.
