= Monkton Old Hall =

Grade I listed building in Pembroke, Pembrokeshire, Wales

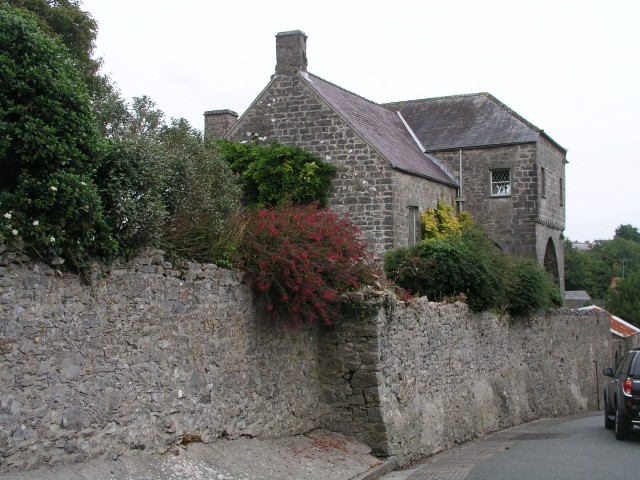
- Monkton Old Hall in 2008
- Interactive map of the Monkton Old Hall area

General information
- Location: 9 Bridgend Terrace, Pembroke SA71 4LW
- Coordinates: 51.6748°N 4.9211°W

Design and construction
- Designations: (see Designated landmark)

Monkton Old Hall is a Grade I listed building in Pembroke, Pembrokeshire. While the chimney is of Norman architecture, the rest of the building dates from the 14th century with restorations in the late 19th and early 20th centuries.

== History ==
The building was originally a guesthouse for Monkton Priory, located nearby. The current building mostly dates from the 14th century, but the chimney is of earlier construction in the Norman architectural style. After the dissolution of the Monasteries, the building was split up into multiple tenements. J.R. Cobb began a restoration in 1879, as it had been reduced to a ruin consisting of an empty shell. These renovations included the addition of the present roof.

Further modifications took place post-1933, with the addition of leaded windows. Monkton Old Hall became Grade I listed on 10 February 1951. In 1979, Leonard Beddall-Smith conducted further works on the building on behalf of the Landmark Trust, which now offers it as a holiday let. The gardens are designated Grade II on the Cadw/ICOMOS Register of Parks and Gardens of Special Historic Interest in Wales.
