= Listed buildings in Beamsley =

Beamsley is a civil parish in the county of North Yorkshire, England. It contains 14 listed buildings that are recorded in the National Heritage List for England. Of these, one is listed at Grade I, the highest of the three grades, one is at Grade II*, the middle grade, and the others are at Grade II, the lowest grade. The parish contains the village of Beamsley and the surrounding countryside. The most important listed building in the parish is Beamsley Hospital, a group of almshouses incorporating a chapel. The other listed buildings consist of houses and cottages, farmhouses and farm buildings, and a former watermill.

== Key ==
| Grade | Criteria |
|---|---|
| I | Buildings of exceptional interest, sometimes considered to be internationally important |
| II* | Particularly important buildings of more than special interest |
| II | Buildings of national importance and special interest |

== Buildings ==
| Name and location | Photograph | Date | Notes | Grade |
|---|---|---|---|---|
| Beamsley Hospital (north range); 53.97383°N 1.87599°W | | 1593 | Almshouses and a chapel that were altered in the 17th century. The building is in stone with a conical roof, and has a circular plan with a central circular lantern. It consists of seven rooms radiating round a central circular chapel. The doorway has a chamfered surround and a four-centred arched head, and the windows have two lights and chamfered mullions. The lantern contains mullioned windows, with three chimney stacks between, and it is surmounted by a finial. | I |
| Beamsley Hospital (south range); 53.97329°N 1.87588°W | | 1593 | Almshouses that were altered in the 17th century, in stone with stone slate roofs. There are seven bays. In the centre is a segmental arch, above which are two tablets, the left with an inscription, and the right with two coats of arms. The three bays to the left have two storeys, and those to the right are stepped into the hillside, and have a single storey. The windows have chamfered mullions. | II* |
| Beamsley Hall; 53.96880°N 1.88701°W | — | 17th century | The house, which was extensively altered in the 19th century, is in stone and has a stone slate roof with gable coping and finials. There are two storeys, the main part has six bays, to the north is an earlier wing, and to the south is a three-bay extension with a hipped roof. Most of the windows are mullioned or mullioned and transomed, and in the south extension are sash windows. | II |
| Barn east of Beamsley Hall; 53.96901°N 1.88591°W | — | 17th century | A barn in stone with a stone slate roof and five bays. In the centre are double-doors raised above the eaves level, and the interior is aisled. | II |
| Bridgend; 53.97192°N 1.89117°W | | 17th century | The house is in stone that has a stone slate roof with stone coping and shaped kneelers. There are two storeys and three bays. On the front are two doorways with chamfered surrounds, one with a hood mould. The windows either have one light, or two to four lights with chamfered mullions. | II |
| Pace Gate Farmhouse and outbuilding 53.98866°N 1.82427°W | | 17th century | The farmhouse and outbuildings are in stone with a stone slate roof. The farmhouse has two storeys and two bays, to the right is a single-storey single-bay outbuilding, to the left is a two-storey three-bay outbuilding, and at the rear is an earlier two-storey single-bay block. The house has modillion eaves, and stone coped gables with shaped kneelers. The central doorway has a quoined surround, and the windows are mullioned. In the rear block is a doorway with a four-centred arched head, and a window with chamfered mullions. | II |
| Wharfe View; 53.96680°N 1.88083°W | — | 17th century | A pair of stone cottages with a stone slate roof, two storeys and three bays. On the front are two doorways, the left with a chamfered surround and a four-centred arched head. The windows are mullioned with three lights. | II |
| Currer Hall; 53.95924°N 1.86172°W | — | Early 18th century | The house is in stone with a moulded floor band, deep moulded eaves with a blocking course, and a stone slate roof with stone coping. There are two storeys and seven bays. On the front are three giant Doric pilasters, and entablatures with triglyphs. The doorway has an eared moulded architrave and a segmental pediment, and the windows have mullions and transoms in moulded architraves. | II |
| Currer Hall Cottage; 53.95901°N 1.86130°W | — | Mid 18th century | The cottage is in stone, with quoins, and a stone slate roof with moulded stone coping and shaped kneelers. There are two storeys and three bays. The central doorway has a chamfered surround. Above the doorway is a square casement window, the other windows on the front are mullioned with three lights, and at the rear is a five-light window. Inside the house is a large inglenook fireplace. | II |
| Ivy Cottage and Rose Cottage; 53.97187°N 1.89101°W | | 18th century | A pair of stone cottages with a stone slate roof., two storeys and three bays. On the front are three doorways, one blocked. One of the windows is a casement, one is a horizontally-sliding sash, and the others are mullioned. | II |
| Pembroke Lodge and The Mullions; 53.97336°N 1.87542°W | — | 18th century | A pair of stone houses that have a stone slate roof with stone coping and shaped kneelers. There are two storeys and five bays, the right bay later and recessed. On the front is a porch and a doorway. There is one fixed-light window, a casement window, and the other windows are mullioned with four lights. | II |
| Beamsley Mill; 53.96884°N 1.88222°W | | Mid to late 18th century | A former watermill and attached house, in stone with a stone slate roof. There are three storeys and three bays, and a two-storey three-bay wing to the left. The building contains doorways, one with a segmental arch and voussoirs, and the windows are casements. To the right is a wheel chamber with a small opening and pigeon holes, containing an overshot iron wheel. | II |
| Barn behind Hardy Grange Farmhouse; 53.96928°N 1.88279°W | — | Late 18th to early 19th century | A threshing barn and a shed in stone with a stone slate roof. The barn has an L-shaped plan, and contains doorways, one with a segmental arch, and others with semicircular-arched heads, and vents. On the left gable is a ball finial. To the right is a single-storey extension containing three stable doors with semicircular heads. | II |
| Hardy Grange Farmhouse; 53.96923°N 1.88319°W | | Mid to late 19th century | The farmhouse is in rendered stone with a stone slate roof. There are two storeys and four bays, the outer bays projecting and gabled. In the middle two bays, the roof oversails to form a porch containing a doorway. The windows are double-chamfered and mullioned, and in the roof of the middle two bays are gabled dormers. | II |
