= Rowington =

Village in Warwickshire, England

Coordinates: 52°19′N 1°42′W

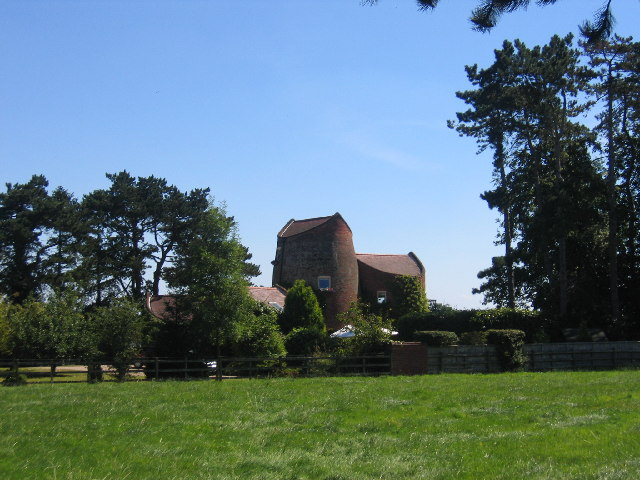
- The old Rowington windmill, now a house

- Location within Warwickshire
- Population: 944 (2011 census)
- Civil parish: Rowington
- District: Warwick
- Shire county: Warwickshire
- Region: West Midlands
- Country: England
- Sovereign state: United Kingdom
- Police: Warwickshire
- Fire: Warwickshire
- Ambulance: West Midlands

Rowington is a village and civil parish in the Warwick district, in the county of Warwickshire, England. It is five miles north-west of the town of Warwick and five miles south-west of the town of Kenilworth. The parish, which also includes Lowsonford, Pinley and Mousley End, had a population of 925 according to the 2001 UK Census, increasing to 944 at the 2011 Census. The Grand Union Canal runs just south of the village and the M40 motorway is also close by. The Heart of England Way for long-distance walkers passes through the village. The parish church of St. Laurence which dates from medieval times is found on a hill in the centre of the village. In the Tudor era Rowington manor was owned by Queen Catherine Parr.

Possibly the most famous building however is Shakespeare Hall, where a branch of William Shakespeare's family is reputed to have lived at the same time he was alive, and indeed Rowington is specifically mentioned in Shakespeare's will. It has been claimed he wrote As You Like It there. There is a more modern rival claim (dating from 1973) that that play was written at Billesley.

There were once several windmills in the village but only one remains and its sails have been removed and the building converted into a house. At one time Rowington quarries supplied sandstone for several important buildings including St Philip's Cathedral in Birmingham, the parish church of St. Laurence and nearby Baddesley Clinton manor house. No quarries remain in Rowington. The village is home to several farms and livery yards. James Blyth once lived in the village and became a life peer in 1995.

== Sources ==
- Barker, R. "Rowington - A Warwickshire Parish". Archived from the original on 27 December 2012.
- Barker, R. "Rowington - A Brief History". Archived from the original on 29 June 2012.
- "Civil Parish population 2011". Office for National Statistics.
- "State Intelligence". Crown Office. The London Gazette (54113). The Stationery Office: 10299. 27 July 1995.
