= Laughton Place =

Coordinates: 50.8833°N 0.1075°E

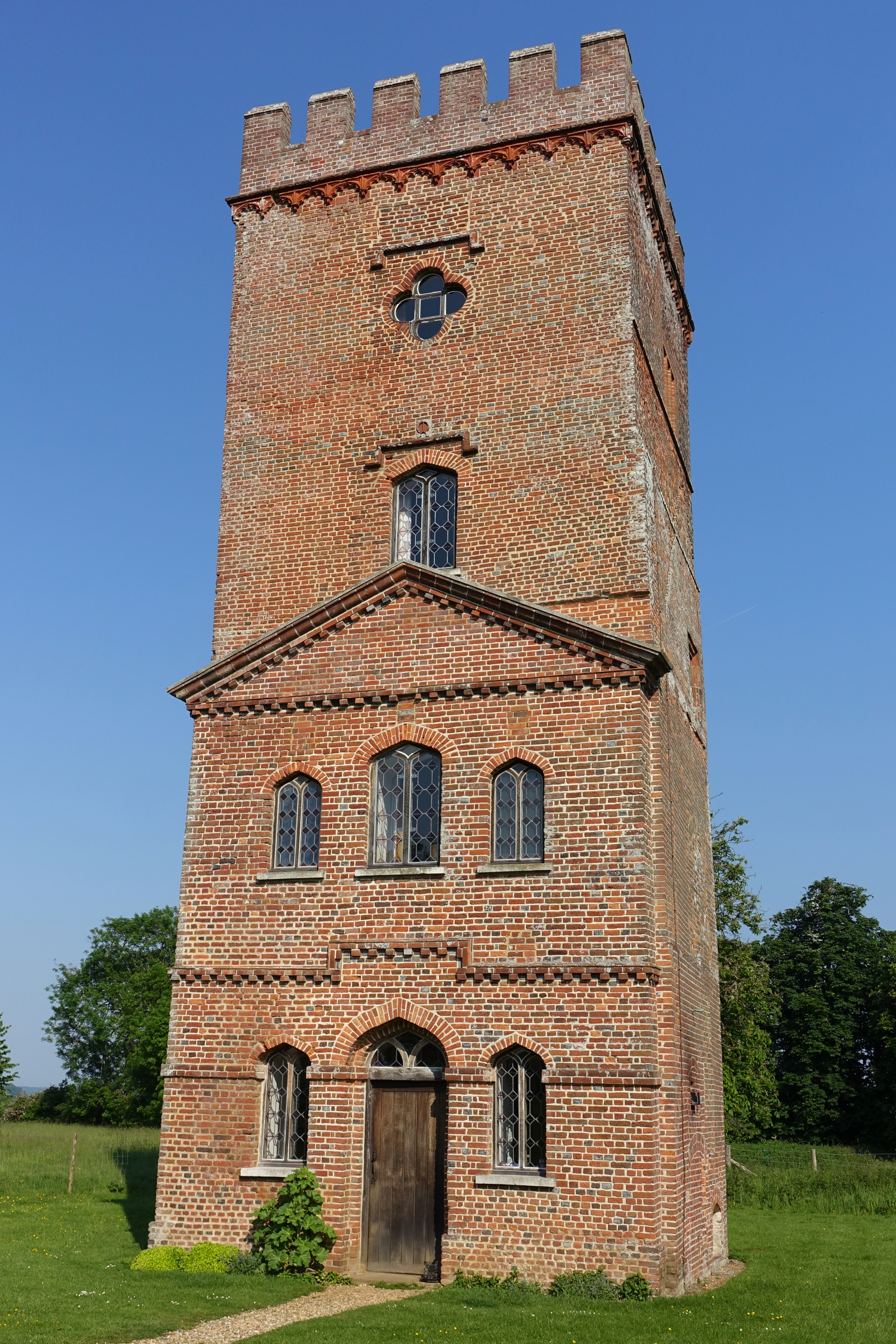
Laughton Place

Laughton Place is a historic building near Lewes, Sussex owned by the Landmark Trust. The Pelham family bought Laughton Place, an old fortified manor, in 1466; it was rebuilt in 1534 by William Pelham. Laughton Tower was restored under the supervision of architect John Warren in the 1980s.

The tower at Laughton Place was built in 1534 by Sir William Pelham and is all that remains of the house that existed from the 13th century until the 1950s. The purpose of the tower is uncertain, but it is likely that it served as an outlook over the marshy surroundings for both practical purposes and pleasure. Laughton Place was one of the first brick-built buildings in the county. Manufacturing bricks was once a major industry here with the village once having four brickworks. Brick manufacturing ended here just before World War II.
