= Porthmeor =

Hamlet in Cornwall, England

Coordinates: 50°11′N 5°36′W

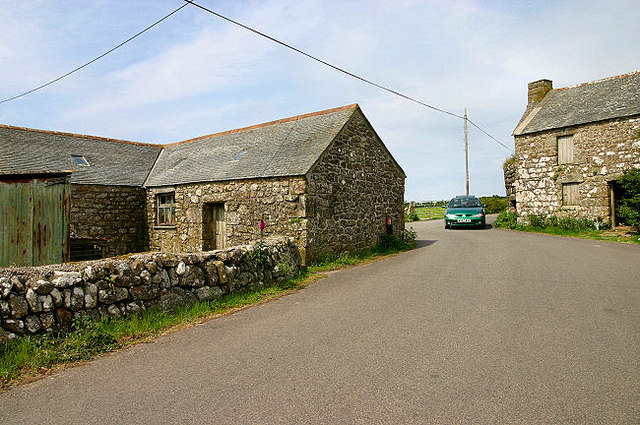
- The main road (B3306) between St Ives and St Just at Porthmeor

- Location within Cornwall
- OS grid reference: SW431371
- Civil parish: Zennor
- Unitary authority: Cornwall
- Ceremonial county: Cornwall
- Region: South West
- Country: England
- Sovereign state: United Kingdom
- Post town: PENZANCE
- Postcode district: TR20
- Dialling code: 01736

Porthmeor (from Cornish: Porth Meur, meaning "large cove") is a hamlet that consists of two farms, Higher and Lower Porthmeor, in the parish of Zennor in Cornwall, England. It should not be confused with Porthmeor beach at St Ives. Higher Porthmeor lies along the B3306 road which connects St Ives to the A30 road and Lower Porthmeor is nearer the coast.

Porthmeor lies within the Cornwall Area of Outstanding Natural Beauty (AONB). Almost a third of Cornwall has AONB designation, with the same status and protection as a National Park.

At Porthmeor is an Iron Age village which has been excavated; the archaeologists' opinion is that it was abandoned in the 5th or 6th century. However the farms of the present day are still surrounded by the massive moorstone boundary walls which protect the stock from the almost constant winds. These farms are probably medieval; many blocks of moorstone have been used on the farms, e.g. as cornerstones, rubbing posts and stiles.

== See also ==
- List of farms in Cornwall
