= Landmark Trust =

British building conservation charity

The Landmark Trust
- Formation: 1965
- Legal status: Building conservation and preservation charity
- Headquarters: Shottesbrooke, Berkshire, United Kingdom
- Region served: Predominantly UK
- Director: Dr Anna Keay
- Website: www.landmarktrust.org.uk

The Landmark Trust is a British building conservation charity, founded in 1965 by Sir John and Lady Smith, that rescues buildings of historic interest or architectural merit and then makes them available for holiday rental. The Trust's headquarters is at Shottesbrooke in Berkshire.

Most Landmark Trust properties are in England, Scotland and Wales. Several are on Lundy Island off the coast of north Devon, operated under lease from the National Trust. There are also seven Landmark Trust properties in Italy.

The Trust is a charity registered in England & Wales and in Scotland. An independent sister charity, The Landmark Trust USA, was originally a part of the Landmark Trust but has operated as a separate organisation since 1999. There are five properties in Vermont, USA, one of which, Naulakha, was the home of Rudyard Kipling in the 1890s. There is also an Irish Landmark Trust.

Those who rent Landmarks provide a source of funds to support restoration costs and building maintenance. The first rentals were in 1967 when six properties were available. The Trust's 200th property, Llwyn Celyn, opened for rental in October 2018. Landmark sites include forts, farmhouses, manor houses, mills, cottages, castles, gatehouses, follies and towers and represent historic periods from medieval to the 20th century.

== Governance and administration ==
The Trust employs a 400-person workforce headed by a Director. Anna Keay was appointed Director in 2012, succeeding Peter Pearce (1995–2012) and Robin Evans FRICS (1986–1995).

The work of the Trust is overseen by a board of trustees chaired by Neil Mendoza.

Prince Charles became Patron of the Landmark Trust in 1995.

A group of high-profile supporters act as Ambassadors for the Trust, helping raise awareness of the Trust's role in rescuing and preserving remarkable buildings. As at March 2017 these were: David Armstrong-Jones; George Clarke; Nicholas Coleridge; Simon Jenkins; Griff Rhys Jones; and Natascha McElhone.

== In media ==
The Gothic Temple at Stowe was filmed in March 1999 as the Scottish Chapel in the Bond movie The World Is Not Enough.

In May 2015 five life-sized sculptures by Antony Gormley, titled Land, were placed near the centre of the UK and at four compass points, in a commission by the Landmark Trust to celebrate its 50th anniversary. They were at Lowsonford (Warwickshire), Lundy (Bristol Channel), Clavell Tower (Dorset), Saddell Bay (Mull of Kintyre), and the Martello Tower (Aldeburgh, Suffolk). The sculpture at Saddell Bay is to remain in place permanently following an anonymous donation and the granting of planning permission. The sculpture on Lundy was relocated to Cambridge.

The work of the Trust was the subject of a six-part Channel 4 television documentary, Restoring Britain's Landmarks, first broadcast in October 2015.

Four Channel 4 programmes, Great British Buildings: Restoration of the Year, transmitted from 23 March 2017, were co-hosted by Landmark Trust Director Anna Keay and Kevin McCloud. Buildings featured included Belmont, Lyme Regis.

In May 2025, two More4 programmes, Historic House Rescue, were transmitted featuring Calverley Old Hall and Fairburn Tower.

== Properties available for holiday lets ==
The following lists aim to be complete and illustrate both the variety of structures and geographical spread of the trust. In the Trust's early years, prior to the incorporation of the charity, properties were often bought with the support of the Manifold Trust. The Landmark Trust's current portfolio also includes properties bequeathed to the Trust, leased, or operated through a management agreement on behalf of other owners. Dates of acquisition and first lettings are shown where available from Landmark Trust or other published sources; time differences between dates often reflect previous/current ownership and the extent of restoration required.

Detailed histories of each building are prepared by the Trust's Historian during its renovation. These include summaries plus before and after photographs of restoration works as carried out. Each building history is then left as an album in the property for visitors to peruse. All Trust property history albums were made available online for the first time in October 2018.

=== Channel Islands ===
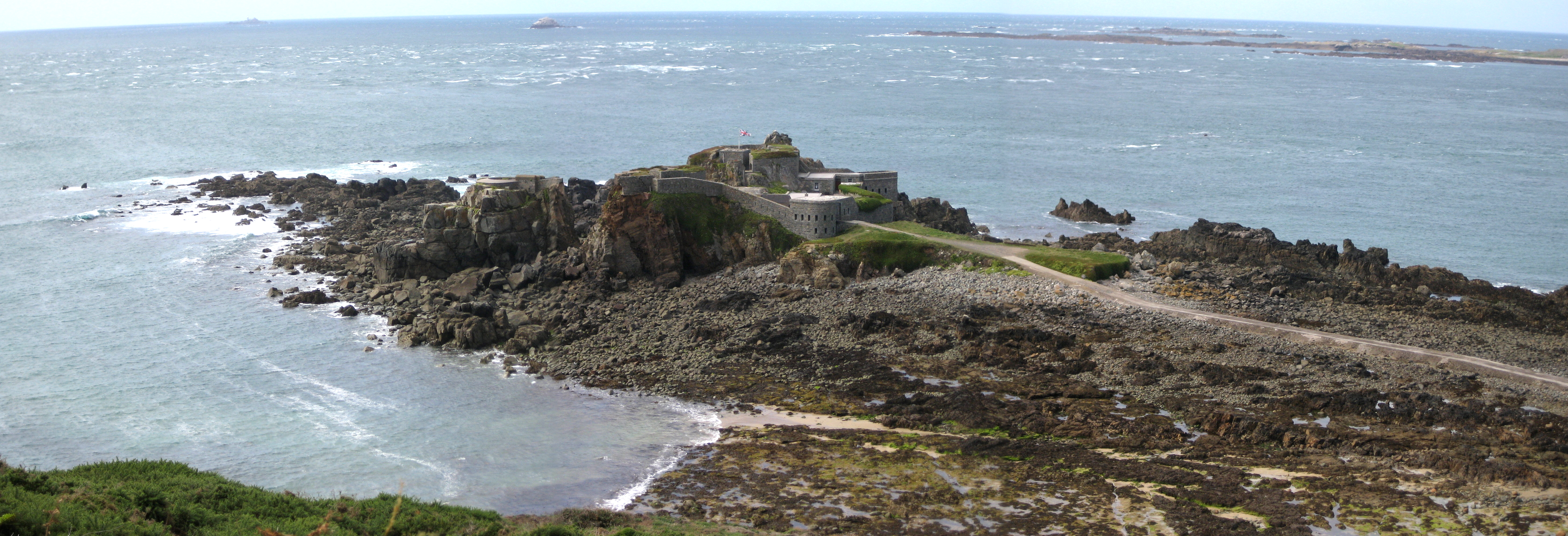
Fort Clonque, Alderney

- Fort Clonque, Alderney
- Nicolle Tower, St Clement, Jersey

=== England ===
==== Lundy ====
The Landmark Trust manages the Island of Lundy in the Bristol Channel on behalf of the National Trust, and operates a number of holiday cottages there. The properties managed by the Trust include:

- The Barn
- Bramble Villa East
- Bramble Villa West
- Castle and Keep Cottages
- Government House
- Hanmers
- Millcombe House
- The Old House
- The Old Light
- The Old School
- The Quarters
- Radio Room
- St John's
- Square Cottage
- Stoneycroft
- Tibbets
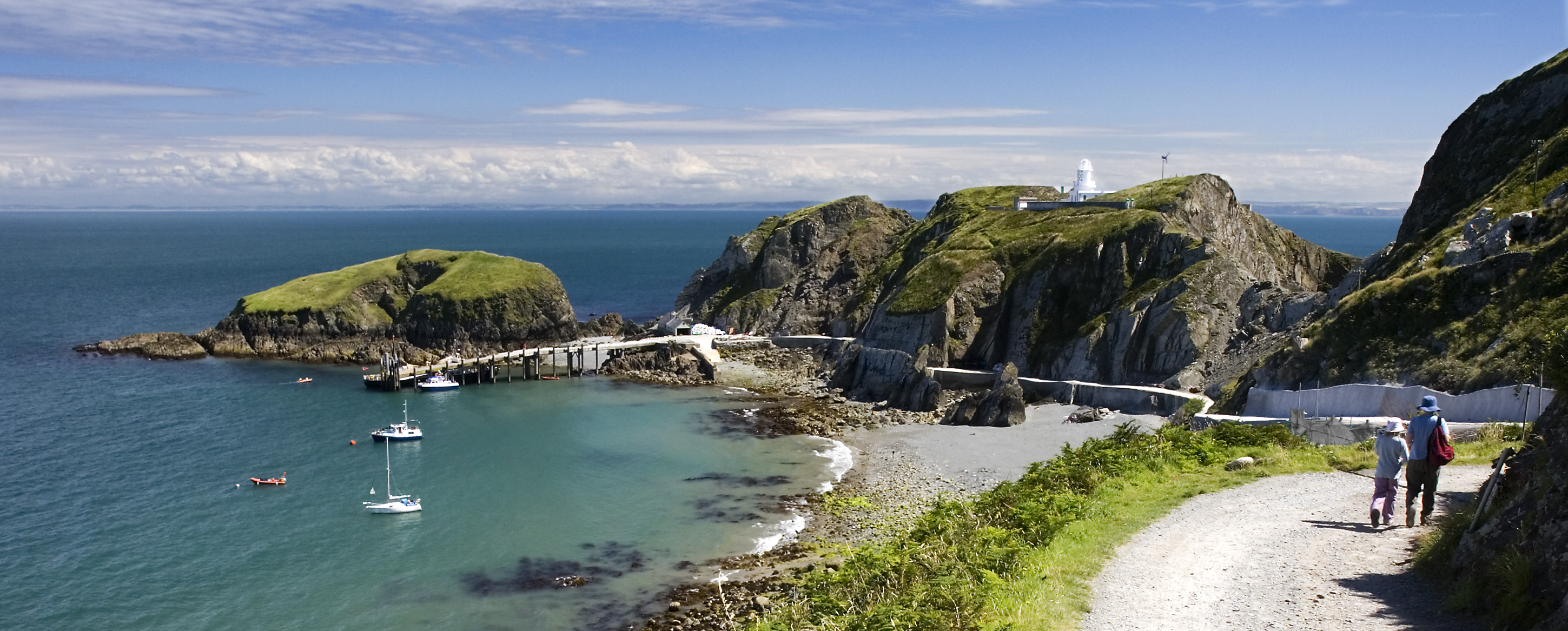
Jetty and harbour, Lundy

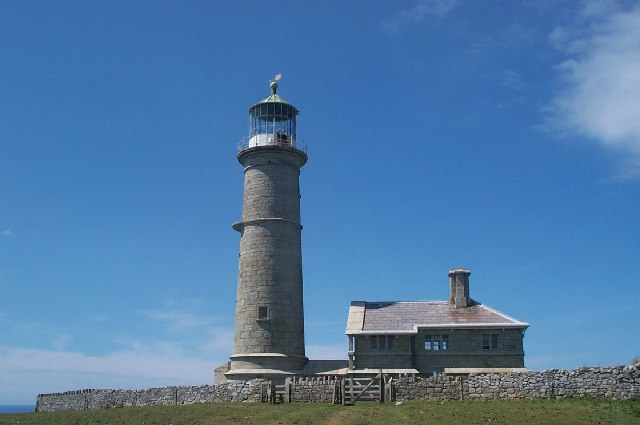
The Old Light, Lundy

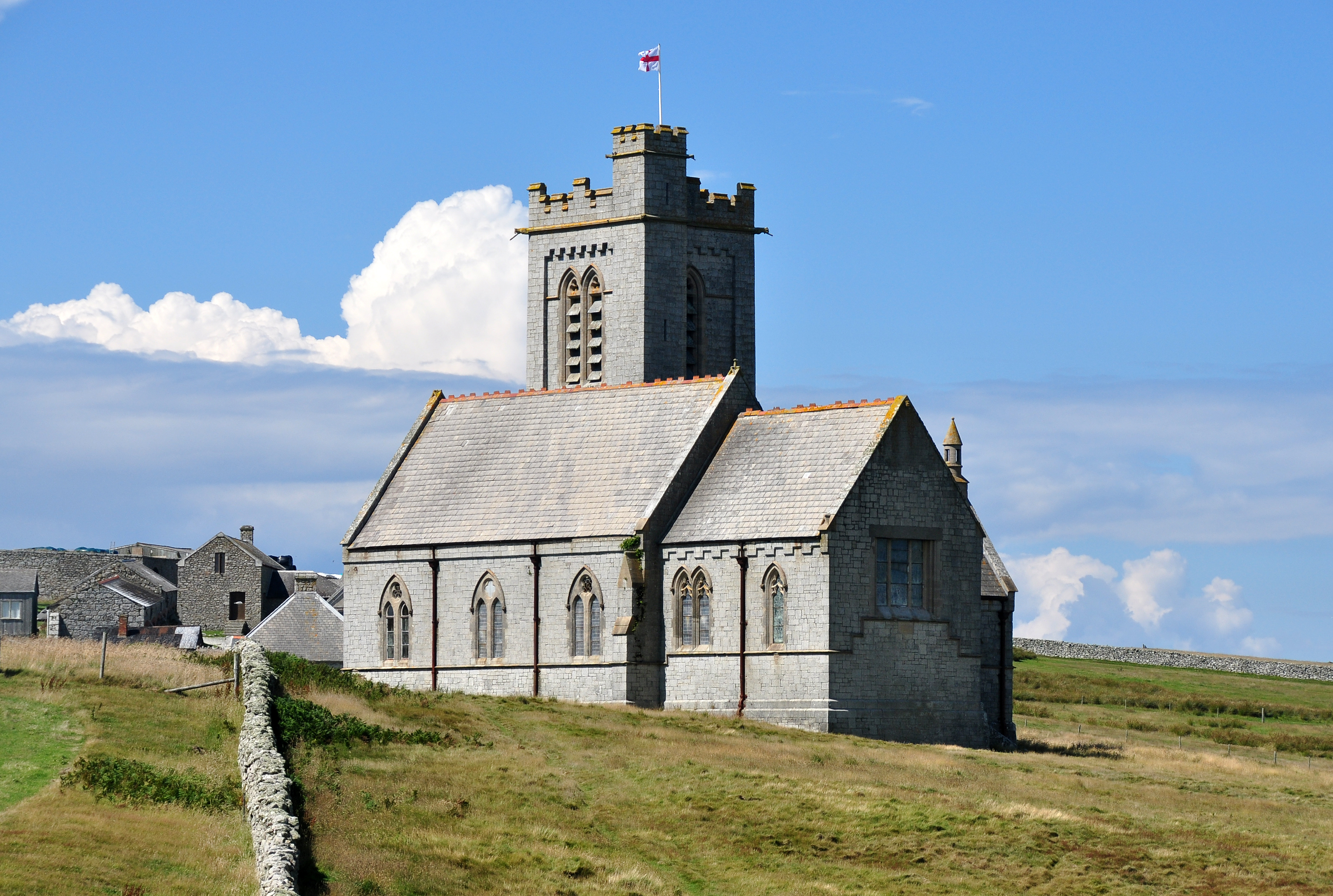
St Helen's Church, Lundy

==== London and South East England ====
Name	Image	Place	County	Acquired	Opened for lets	Notes
43 and 45a Cloth Fair		Smithfield	London EC1	1981		Two properties. 43 is the former home of the late Poet Laureate Sir John Betjeman.
Cobham Dairy		Cobham	Kent	2016/17	2019	Grade II* ornamental dairy designed by James Wyatt in the 1790s in the style of an Italianate chapel, on the Buildings at Risk register. The Trust launched an appeal in 2016 to rescue the building and had raised £200,000 by 31 March 2017, thereby securing a further £200,000 match funding from Ecclesiastical Insurance. The full target of £954,000 was achieved by late 2017. Renovation started during 2018 and was completed in Autumn 2019.
Fox Hall		Charlton	West Sussex	1983		
Goddards		Abinger Common	Surrey	1991	1997	Architect: Edwin Lutyens 1898–1900, 1910
Gothic Temple		Stowe	Buckinghamshire	1970	1977	
The Grange		Ramsgate	Kent	1997	2006	Architect: Augustus Pugin
Georgian House, Hampton Court Palace		East Molesey	Surrey	1993	1993	Built as a kitchen, later housing Foreman of the Gardens and Clerk of Works.
Hole Cottage		Cowden	Kent	1969	1970	
Laughton Place		near Lewes	East Sussex	1978		
Luttrell's Tower		Eaglehurst, near Southampton	Hampshire	1968	1968	
Mayor's Parlour, Maison Dieu		Dover	Kent	2020	2025	
Obriss Farm		near Westerham	Kent	1990	1996	
The Old Parsonage		Iffley, Oxford	Oxfordshire	1997		
Oxenford Gatehouse		Elstead	Surrey	2009	2010	
Princelet Street		Spitalfields	London E1	2004	2005	
The Prospect Tower		Belmont Park, Faversham	Kent	1990	1992	
St Edward's Presbytery		Ramsgate	Kent	2010	2015	
Sackville House		East Grinstead	West Sussex	1995	1997	Bequeathed by Ursula Honess, granddaughter of Sir Aston Webb.
Semaphore Tower		Chatley HeathCobham	Surrey	2018	2021	
The Steward's House		Oxford	Oxfordshire	1985	1986	
Wilmington Priory		near Eastbourne	East Sussex	1999	2000	Leased from Sussex Archaeological Society who operated it as a museum until 1992. Appeal launched for restoration and renovation in 1995/1996.

==== East of England ====
Name	Image	Place	County	Acquired	Opened for lets	Notes
The Ancient House		Clare	Suffolk	1999		Heritage Lottery Fund grant £82,200 towards restoration, 1997
Cavendish Hall		Cavendish	Suffolk	2010	2010	
Freston Tower		Ipswich	Suffolk	2001	2005	
Houghton West Lodge		Houghton	Norfolk	1990	1996	
Keeper's Cottage		Shuttleworth	Bedfordshire	2004	2007	
Lynch Lodge		Alwalton, near Peterborough	Cambridgeshire	1983		
Manor Farm		Pulham Market, near Diss	Norfolk	1979		
Martello Tower		Aldeburgh	Suffolk	1971		
Methwold Old Vicarage		Methwold	Norfolk	1998	2002	
New Inn		Peasenhall	Suffolk	1971		Three separate lets prior to refurbishment in 2013
Peake's House		Colchester	Essex	1995	1995	
Purton Green		Stansfield	Suffolk	1969	1971	
Queen Anne's Summerhouse		Shuttleworth, Old Warden	Bedfordshire	2004	2009	
Stoker's Cottage		Stretham	Cambridgeshire	2005	2007	
Warden Abbey		Old Warden	Bedfordshire	1974	1976	Remodelled 2017
The Warren House		Kimbolton	Cambridgeshire	2004	2012	

==== North of England ====
Name	Image	Place	County	Acquired	Opened for lets	Notes
The Banqueting House, Gibside		Gibside	Tyne & Wear	1977	1981	Winner in Sunday Times / Jackson-Stops & Staff "Country House Awards", April 1988
Beamsley Hospital		near Skipton	North Yorkshire	1983	1983	
Brinkburn Mill		near Rothbury	Northumberland	1990	1992	
Calverley Old Hall		Calverley	West Yorkshire	1981	1984	
Causeway House		Bardon Mill	Northumberland	1988		
Cawood Castle		Cawood, near Selby	North Yorkshire	1985		
Coop House		Netherby, near Carlisle	Cumbria	1992		
Cowside		Langstrothdale	North Yorkshire		2011	
Culloden Tower		Richmond	North Yorkshire	1981		
The Grammar School		Kirby Hill	North Yorkshire	1973	1975	
Howthwaite		Grasmere	Cumbria	1986		
Morpeth Castle		Morpeth	Northumberland	1988	1991	
The Music Room		Lancaster	Lancashire	1974	1977	Negotiations to purchase started 1970. Refurbished 2013
The Pigsty		Robin Hood's Bay	North Yorkshire	1988	1991	
The Ruin		Hackfall, Grewelthorpe	North Yorkshire	2001	2005	Hackfall Gardens acquired by the Woodland Trust in 1989 who invited Landmark Trust to restore this building, then known as Mowbray Point. Appeal for purchase (£10,000) and restoration (£250,000) launched 1990.
The Station Agent's House		Manchester	Greater Manchester	2023	2024	

==== Midlands ====
Name	Image	Place	County	Acquired	Opened for lets	Notes
Abbey Gatehouse		Tewkesbury	Gloucestershire	1986		Built 1500, standing guard over Tewkesbury Abbey
Alton Station		Alton	Staffordshire	1970	1972	Former railway station for Alton Towers
Astley Castle		Nuneaton	Warwickshire	1995	2012	First lease surrendered 2001. Winner of the 2013 Stirling Prize
The Bath House		Near Stratford-upon-Avon	Warwickshire	1987	1991	
The Birdhouse		Badger Dingle	Shropshire	2015	2016	
Bromfield Priory Gatehouse		Near Ludlow	Shropshire	1990	1993	First listed as opening in 1992
Bush Cottage		Near Bridgnorth	Shropshire	2011	2011	
The Chateau		Gate Burton	Lincolnshire	1981		
Field House		Minchinhampton	Gloucestershire	1986		
The House of Correction		Folkingham	Lincolnshire	1982	1986	
Ingestre Pavilion		Tixall	Staffordshire	1988	1991	
Iron Bridge House		Ironbridge	Shropshire	1972	1977	
Knowle Hill		Near Ticknall	Derbyshire	1989	1994	Building restoration started 1992
Langley Gatehouse		Near Acton Burnell	Shropshire	1992	1993	Repairs funded by English Heritage
Lengthsman's Cottage		Lowsonford	Warwickshire	1992	2006	Located on the towpath of the Stratford-upon-Avon Canal
Lock Cottage		Stoke Pound	Worcestershire	1991	1993	Built between 1790 and 1815, located on the Worcester and Birmingham Canal
North Street		Cromford	Derbyshire	1974	1987	Earliest piece of planned industrial housing in the world, at the heart of a designated World Heritage Site.
Old Campden House – East Banqueting House		Chipping Campden	Gloucestershire	1987	1990	
Old Campden House – West Banqueting House		Chipping Campden	Gloucestershire	1998	2003	
32 St Mary's Lane		Tewkesbury	Gloucestershire	1982		
St Winifred's Well		Woolston, near Oswestry	Shropshire	1987		
Shelwick Court		Near Hereford	Herefordshire	1981	1984	
Swarkestone Pavilion		Near Ticknall	Derbyshire	1985		
Tixall Gatehouse		Near Stafford	Staffordshire	1968	1977	
The Tower		Canons Ashby	Northamptonshire	1980		
The White House		Aston Munslow	Shropshire	1990	1991	

==== Southwest ====
Name	Image	Place	County	Acquired	Opened for lets	Notes
Anderton House		Goodleigh	Devon	2000	2003	Architect: Peter Aldington, 1969
Arra Venton		Lower Porthmeor	Cornwall		1991	First listed as opening in 1989
Beckford's Tower		Bath	Somerset	2000	2000	
Belmont		Lyme Regis	Dorset	2006	2015	
Bridge Cottage		Peppercombe	Devon	1988		
The Captain's House		Lower Porthmeor	Cornwall	1995	1995	Previously leased to National Trust; Lease transferred to Landmark Trust 1995
Castle Bungalow		Peppercombe	Devon	1988	1991	
Cawsey House		Great Torrington	Devon	1989	1998	Opened in April 1998 as 28 South Street.
The Chapel		Lettaford, North Bovey	Devon	1978		
The China Tower		Bicton	Devon	2013	2013	
Clavell Tower		Kimmeridge, Wareham	Dorset	2006	2008	Appeal for restoration, including re-siting away from cliff edge, launched February 2003.
The College		Week St Mary	Cornwall	1976	1978	
Coombe	A hamlet of eight properties situated next to a confluence of two streams and 1/4 mile from Duckpool Beach. The ford adjacent to Ford Cottage is the location for occasional rubber duck races.					
Coombe – The Carpenter's Shop		Coombe, Bude	Cornwall	1966	1969	
Coombe – Chapel Cottage		Coombe, Bude	Cornwall	1966	1967	
Coombe – Coombe Corner		Coombe, Bude	Cornwall	1984		
Coombe – Ford Cottage		Coombe, Bude	Cornwall	1966	1969	
Coombe – 1, Hawkers Cottage		Coombe, Bude	Cornwall	1969	1985	
Coombe – 2, Hawkers Cottage		Coombe, Bude	Cornwall	1968	1968	
Coombe – 1, Mill House		Coombe, Bude	Cornwall	1966	1968	
Coombe – 2, Mill House		Coombe, Bude	Cornwall	1966	1968	
Crownhill Fort		Plymouth	Devon	1987	1995	
Danescombe Mine		Calstock	Cornwall	1972	1973	
Dunshay Manor		Worth Matravers	Dorset	2006	2019	Bequeathed to the Trust in 2006 by Mary Spencer Watson. Initially part of the Trust's Legacy Estate, proposed for a 20-year lease from 2013, much repair work was undertaken in the subsequent four years. In Spring 2018 the Trust announced further renovation would take place during the Summer to enable the Manor to be available for lets from 2019. Bookings for the manor from May 2019 onwards were opened on 9 March 2019.
The Egyptian House		Penzance	Cornwall	1968	1971	
Elton House		Bath	Somerset	1982	1996	Bequeathed by Philippa Savery, 1982
The Farmhouse		Lower Porthmeor	Cornwall			
Frenchman's Creek		Helford	Cornwall	1987	1990	
Gurney Manor		Cannington	Somerset	1984	1992	
Kingswear Castle		Near Dartmouth	Devon	1987	1990	
The Library		Stevenstone	Devon	1978		
Margells		Branscombe	Devon	1975	1976	
Marshal Wade's House		Bath	Somerset	1975	1976	
The Old Hall		Croscombe	Somerset	1975	1976	
Parish House		Baltonsborough	Somerset	1990	1995	First listed as "Church House" for opening in 1992
Peters Tower		Lympstone	Devon	1979		
Pond Cottage		Endsleigh, near Tavistock	Devon	1983	1984	
The Priest's House		Holcombe Rogus	Devon	1984		
Robin Hood's Hut		Halswell, Goathurst	Somerset	2000	2004	
Sanders		Lettaford, North Bovey	Devon	1976	1978	
Shute Gatehouse		Near Axminster	Devon	1978		
Silverton Park Stables		Silverton	Devon	1987	2008	
Stogursey Castle		Stogursey, Bridgwater	Somerset	1982	1983	
Swiss Cottage		Endsleigh, near Tavistock	Devon	1977		Designed by Jeffrey Wyatville
The Wardrobe		Salisbury	Wiltshire	1979		
Whiteford Temple		Callington	Cornwall	1984		
Winsford Cottage Hospital		Halwill Junction	Devon		2019	Grade II* former Cottage Hospital designed by CFA Voysey in 1900, also on the Buildings at Risk register. After being declared surplus to needs by the NHS in 1999, the hospital was acquired by the Winsford Trust who gained some support for renovation from English Heritage and the Pilgrim Trust. Proposals for joint community use and a Landmark Trust holiday let were presented to the local community in November 2016. In June 2017 an appeal was launched to save the hospital by raising £355,000 within twelve months, adding to an initial £96,000 grant from the Heritage Lottery Fund and money raised through other groups and supporters. By April 2018, the appeal was within sight of its target, needing a final £40,000 to unlock a total Heritage Lottery Fund grant of £486,000. The Trust announced on 19 July 2018 the full required sum of £1.5m had been raised.
Wolveton Gatehouse		Near Dorchester	Dorset			
Woodsford Castle		Near Dorchester	Dorset	1977	1992	
Woodspring Priory		Near Weston-super-Mare	Somerset	1969	1992	Priory Church, Infirmary and Farmhouse acquired from National Trust, 1969. Restoration completed in phases: a) Priory Tower: 1969–1971 b) Priory exterior; removal of Priory interior additions; Infirmary: 1971–1976 c) Farmhouse roof: 1980–1983 d) Farmhouse window plan; South front; Interior: 1983–1992
Wortham Manor		Lifton	Devon	1969	1974	2 flats let until 1990

=== Scotland ===
Name	Image	Place	County	Acquired	Opened for lets	Notes
Ascog House		Ascog	Isle of Bute	1989	1993	
Auchinleck House		Auchinleck	East Ayrshire	1999	2001	Acquired from Scottish Historic Buildings Trust with support from the Heritage Lottery Fund, Historic Scotland and an anonymous benefactor. Built by Lord Auchinleck, father of James Boswell.
Berriedale, Shore Cottages		near Wick	Caithness	2010		
Castle of Park		Glenluce	Dumfries and Galloway	1990	1993	
Collegehill House		Roslin	Lothian	2002	2002	
Fairburn Tower		Inverness	Highland	2013	2023	
Gargunnock House			Stirling			
Glenmalloch Lodge		Newton Stewart	Dumfries and Galloway	2004		
Mackintosh Building		Comrie	Perthshire	1985	1985	
Old Place of Monreith		Port William	Dumfries and Galloway	1983		
The Pineapple		Dunmore	Central Scotland	1973	1974	
Rosslyn Castle		Roslin	Lothian	1977	1985	
Saddell Castle		Kintyre	Argyll and Bute	1978		
Saddell House		Kintyre	Argyll and Bute	1998	2004	
Saddell Lodge		Kintyre	Argyll and Bute	1984	2001	
Saddell – Cul na Shee		Kintyre	Argyll and Bute	1978		
Saddell – Ferryman's Cottage		Kintyre	Argyll and Bute	1990		
Saddell – Shore Cottage		Kintyre	Argyll and Bute	1978		
Tangy Mill		Kintyre	Argyll and Bute	1973	1981	

=== Wales ===
Name	Image	Place	County	Acquired	Opened for lets	Notes
Bath Tower		Caernarfon	Gwynedd	1967	1969	
Church Cottage		Llandygwydd	Cardiganshire	1966	1967	Landmark Trust's first property
Clytha Castle		near Abergavenny	Monmouthshire	1974		
Coed y Bleiddiau		Tan-y-Bwlch, Maentwrog	Gwynedd	2014	2018	Built in 1863 as an intermediate stop on the Ffestiniog Railway for the railway's Superintendent. Later used as a holiday home by Sir Granville Bantock. Renovated following a joint appeal with the railway. Opened for lets April 2018. Retains a private platform to the railway as its main access.
Dolbelydr		Trefnant	Denbighshire	1999	2003	
Llwyn Celyn		Llanvihangel Crucorney	Monmouthshire	2014		Medieval Hall House, formerly part of the Llanthony Priory Estate in the Brecon Beacons Black Mountain area. Under scaffolding from 2009, acquired 2011. Opened for lets October 2018 after two years' on site restoration.
Maesyronnen Chapel		near Hay-on-Wye	Powys	1985		
Monkton Old Hall		Monkton	Pembrokeshire	1979	1982	
Paxton's Tower Lodge		Llanarthney	Carmarthenshire	1966	1967	Lodge to Paxton's Tower
Plas Uchaf		near Corwen	Merionethshire	1971	1973	Leased from Merionethshire County Council, 1971. Updated 2010 including underfloor heating, new kitchen and reconfigured bathroom.
Poultry Cottage		Leighton, Welshpool	Powys	1988		
Stockwell Farm		Old Radnor	Powys			
Tower Hill		St David's	Pembrokeshire	1965		Dilapidated cottages replaced by new building for first lets
Ty Capel, Rhiwddolion		near Betws-y-Coed	Gwynedd	1967		
Ty Coch, Rhiwddolion		near Betws-y-Coed	Gwynedd	1968		
Ty Uchaf, Rhiwddolion		near Betws-y-Coed	Gwynedd	1998	2001	
West Blockhouse		Dale	Pembrokeshire	1969		Palmerston Fort, protecting Milford Haven

=== Italy ===
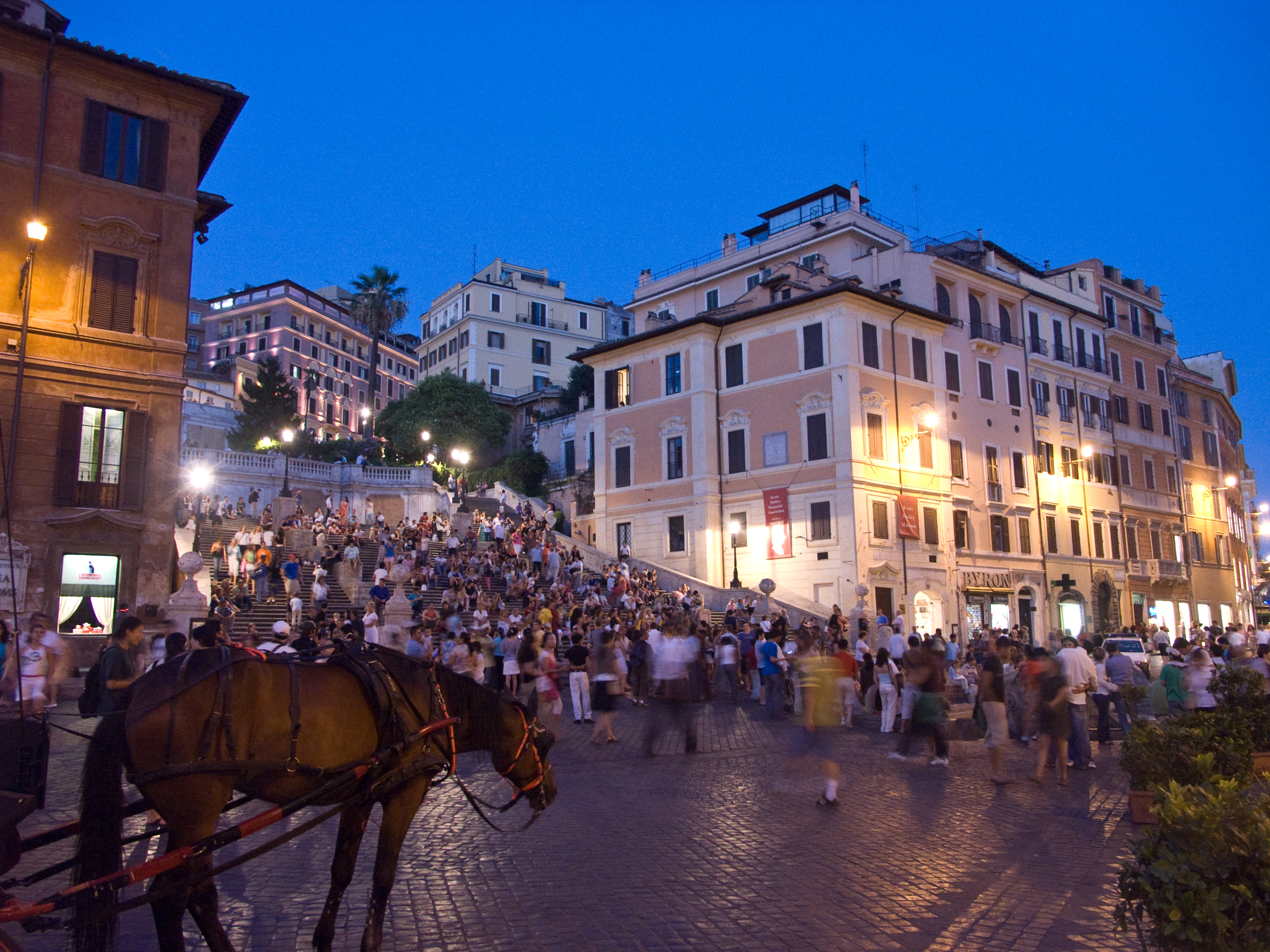
The Spanish Steps, seen from Piazza di Spagna, Italy. John Keats lived in the house in the right foreground.

- Casa de Mar, San Fruttuoso – from summer 2016
- Casa Guidi, Florence – from 1995
- Piazza di Spagna, Rome – from 1982
- Sant'Antonio, Tivoli – from 1995
- Villa Saraceno, Agugliaro – restored 1984–1995
- Villa dei Vescovi, Padua (two apartments) – from 2006

=== United States (Landmark Trust USA) ===
- Amos Brown House, Vermont
- The Dutton Farmhouse, Vermont
- Naulakha (Rudyard Kipling House), Vermont
- Kipling's Carriage House, Naulakha, Vermont
- The Sugarhouse, Vermont

== Projects in development ==
New potential projects:

- Ibsley Watch Tower, Ibsley, Hampshire – Derelict watch tower at one of the twelve RAF airfields in the New Forest. Held on a 99-year lease by RAF Ibsley Heritage Trust.
- Mavisbank, nr Edinburgh, Midlothian – Joint project with Historic Environment Scotland for Scotland's first Palladian villa.
- The South Tower at Wentworth Woodhouse, near Rotherham, South Yorkshire - in partnership with the Wentworth Woodhouse Preservation Trust
- The Clock Tower, Wemyss Bay, Firth of Clyde - Category A listed Italianate tower attached to one of Scotland's finest railway stations

== Other projects previously considered for restoration ==
Other properties previously considered by the Trust, but not progressed to completion, include:

- Almshouses, Denton, Lincolnshire – demolished by then owner Sir Bruno Welby, subsequently convicted in 1980 of unauthorised demolition of historic buildings and fined £1,000 plus costs
- Falsgrave Signal Box, Scarborough, North Yorkshire – under consideration from 2016 to March 2019
- The Master's House, Maidstone, Kent – rejected 2002 on grounds of size
- Mausoleum, Seaton Delavel – rejected for risk of repayment of Department of the Environment grant
- Warder's Tower, Biddulph, Staffordshire – leased from Staffordshire County Council 2008–2010, returned when no acceptable solution could be found for dealing with four colonies of bats

== Former properties ==
Properties formerly run as holiday lets and owned, leased or run by the Landmark Trust on a management arrangement basis include:

- All Saint's Vicarage, Maidenhead – First floor flat in Vicarage complex designed by G.E. Street. Advertised as being prepared for opening for lets in 1990 and in 1991 but not listed in 1992.
- Edale Mill, Edale, Derbyshire – The Trust bought the mill in 1969 and converted it into seven flats. Six were sold after conversion with one being retained for holiday lets until c. 2012.
- Fish Court, Hampton Court Palace – owned by Historic Royal Palaces. Withdrawn from property portfolio in 2014.
- The Harp Inn, Old Radnor, Powys
- Higher Lettaford, North Bovey, Devon – sold in 2013 as no longer appropriate to the Trust's property portfolio
- Hill House, Helensburgh – top floor flat returned to National Trust for Scotland in 2011
- Hougoumont, near Waterloo, Belgium - no longer listed for rent following the expiry of the previous lease
- The Master's House, Gladstone Pottery – The Gladstone Pottery Museum was transferred to Stoke-on-Trent Museums in 1994.
- Meikle Ascog, Ascog, Argyll & Bute – sold in 2013 as no longer appropriate to the Trust's property portfolio
- Le Moulin de la Tuilerie, Gif-sur-Yvette, Essonne, France (formerly let as three properties: La Célibataire, Le Maison des Amis and Le Moulin) – sold in 2020 by the landowner
- Sandford House, 7 Lower High St, Stourbridge, West Midlands
- 30, St Mary's Lane, Tewkesbury – bought in 1969 and let to local tenants from 2006
- Wellbrook Beetling Mill, Cookstown, Co Tyrone – returned to National Trust
- Appleton Water Tower, Sandringham, Norfolk - taken back by the Sandringham Estate in 2026 at the end of the 50 year lease

== Legacy Estate – other properties owned by the Trust ==
In addition to properties let for holiday rentals, the Trust has been bequeathed other properties which it has refurbished and managed in other ways, through its Legacy Estate. These include:

- Fountain Hotel, 92 High Street, Cowes, Isle of Wight – acquired 2010
- The Tower, Netherne Hospital, Netherne-on-the-Hill, Coulsdon, Surrey – bequeathed 2015

== Handbooks ==
Details of each property available to rent are available online, on the Trust's website, and in a Handbook. Twenty-seven editions of the Handbook have been published to 2025:

Edition number	Year	Editor	Cover
1	1966		
2	1968		Green
3	1970		Moss/Lime Green
4	1971		Red
5	1972		Blue
6	1973		Moss Green
7	1977	John Smith	New Inn, Peasenhall
8	1988	Charlotte Haslam	Laughton Place
9	1989	Charlotte Haslam	Cawood Castle
10 (25 years anniversary edition)	1990	Charlotte Haslam	Swarkestone Pavilion
11	1991	Charlotte Haslam	Kingswear Castle
12	1992	John Smith and Charlotte Haslam	The Bath House
13	1993	John Smith and Charlotte Haslam	Prospect Tower
14	1994	Charlotte Haslam	Woodspring Priory
15	1995	Charlotte Haslam	Beamsley Hospital
16	1996	Constance Barrett	Tixall Gatehouse
17	1998		Old Light, Lundy
18	1999	Constance Barrett	Banqueting House
19	2001	Constance Barrett	Swarkestone Pavilion
20	2003	Sophie Horton and Katherine Oates	Prospect Tower
21 (40 years anniversary edition)	2005		Freston Tower
22	2006		Gothic Temple
23	2008		The Pineapple
24	2011		Culloden Tower
25 (50 years anniversary edition)	2014	Helen Hartstein	The Library
26 (published November 2018)	2018		St Winifred's Well
27 (60 years anniversary edition)	2025		Bridge Cottage

== Archives ==
The Landmark Trust Lundy Island Philatelic Archive was donated to the British Library Philatelic Collections in 1991 and is located at the British Library.
