= 13th century in Wales =

- 12th century | 14th century | Other years in Wales
- Other events of the century

This article is about the particular significance of the century 1201–1300 to Wales and its people.

== Princes of Wales ==
- Llywelyn the Great (c. 1218–1240)
- Dafydd ap Llywelyn (1240–1246)
- Llywelyn ap Gruffudd (c. 1246–1282)
- Dafydd ap Gruffudd (1282–83)

(Also Madog ap Llywelyn, proclaimed prince during revolt of 1294–95)

== Events ==
1201

- Llywelyn the Great, Prince of Gwynedd, takes Eifionydd and Llŷn from Maredudd ap Cynan on a charge of treachery.
- July – Llywelyn makes a treaty with King John of England.
- Valle Crucis Abbey founded by Madog ap Gruffydd Maelor.

1202

- August – Llywelyn the Great attacks Gwenwynwyn ab Owain of Powys.

1203

- 7 November – Geoffrey de Henlaw is consecrated as Bishop of St David's.

1204

- King John of England suspects Ranulf de Blondeville, 6th Earl of Chester, of colluding with the Welsh and has his estates temporarily confiscated.

1205

- probable – Llywelyn the Great marries Joan, illegitimate daughter of King John of England.

1206

- King John gives Skenfrith Castle, Grosmont Castle and White Castle to William de Braose, 4th Lord of Bramber.
- Gerald of Wales makes his fourth visit to Rome.

1208

- March – For failing to intervene in the rebellion of William de Braose, 4th Lord of Bramber, Walter II de Clifford is deprived of his Marcher barony of Clifford by King John of England.
- Gwenwynwyn ab Owain is arrested by King John. Llywelyn the Great annexes Gwenwynwyn's territory of southern Powys.

1209

- Llywelyn the Great accompanies his father-in-law, King John of England, on campaign against King William I of Scotland.

1210

- Maud de Braose and her son William are captured and imprisoned by King John, first at Windsor Castle and then at Corfe Castle, where they are starved to death.
- Ranulf de Blondeville, 6th Earl of Chester, and Peter des Roches lead an army into Gwynedd. To impede their progress, Llywelyn destroys his own castle at Deganwy, which Ranulf subsequently rebuilds.

1211

- August – King John of England invades Gwynedd with assistance from other Welsh princes and, at his second attempt, penetrates the heart of Llywelyn the Great's territory. When Robert of Shrewsbury, Bishop of Bangor, refuses to meet John, Bangor is burned and the bishop is taken prisoner.

1212

- Pope Innocent III releases Llywelyn the Great and other Welsh princes from their oaths of loyalty to King John; Llywelyn re-takes most of Gwynedd.

1213

- Llywelyn the Great takes the castles of Deganwy and Rhuddlan.

1214

- 4 December – Llywelyn the Great captures Shrewsbury without resistance.

1215

- 15 June – A clause in Magna Carta compels release of Llywelyn the Great's son Gruffydd ap Llywelyn Fawr, held as a hostage.
- 21 June – Cadwgan of Llandyfai is consecrated as Bishop of Bangor.
- December – Llywelyn captures the south Wales castles of Carmarthen, Kidwelly, Llanstephan, Cardigan and Cilgerran.
- Reginald de Braose, marries Gwladus Ddu.

1216

- 19 October – The death of King John of England and the accession of his son as Henry III relieve political tensions between England and Wales.
- Llywelyn the Great holds a council at Aberdyfi to adjudicate on the territorial claims of the lesser princes of Wales.

1217

- 9 October – Gilbert de Clare, 5th Earl of Gloucester, marries Isabel Marshal (on her 17th birthday).
- Hugh de Lacy, 1st Earl of Ulster, completes the rebuilding of the church at Llanthony Priory.
- Reginald de Braose, son-in-law of Llywelyn the Great, goes over to the English; Llywelyn responds by attacking de Braose's lands. De Braose surrenders Swansea to Llywelyn.

1218

- Treaty of Worcester: Llywelyn the Great makes peace with King Henry III of England, his brother-in-law.

1219

- John de Braose, grandson of William de Braose, 4th Lord of Bramber, marries Marared, daughter of Llywelyn the Great.

1220

- King Henry III of England recognises Dafydd ap Llywelyn as the heir of Llywelyn the Great.
- Hostilities break out between Llywelyn and William Marshal, 2nd Earl of Pembroke.

1221

- Approximate date of the building of Castell y Bere by Llywelyn the Great.

1222

- Llywelyn the Great petitions Pope Honorius II to confirm the succession of his legitimate son, Dafydd ap Llywelyn.
- Elen ferch Llywelyn marries John the Scot, Earl of Chester.

1223

- William Marshal, 2nd Earl of Pembroke, retaliates against Llywelyn the Great, recovering Pembroke.

1226

- Pope Honorius III legitimizes Joan, Lady of Wales, at the request of her husband, Llywelyn the Great.
- Regents of King Henry III of England order William Marshal, 2nd Earl of Pembroke, to surrender the castles of Cardigan and Carmarthen.

1228

- Gilbert de Clare, 5th Earl of Gloucester, leads an army against the Welsh, capturing Morgan Gam.

1229

- King Henry III of England accepts the homage of Dafydd ap Llywelyn for the lands he will inherit from his father, Llywelyn the Great.

1230

- Easter – William de Braose, during a visit to Llywelyn the Great, is found in the bedchamber of Llywelyn's wife Joan. De Braose is hanged and Joan is placed under house arrest.
- probable – Dafydd ap Llywelyn marries Isabella de Braose, daughter of William de Braose.
- probable – The widowed Gwladus Ddu marries Ralph de Mortimer of Wigmore.
- Hay-on-Wye Castle passes into the hands of the de Bohun family.

1231

- 9 February – Anselm le Gras is consecrated as Bishop of St David's.

1232

- Walter III de Clifford marries Margaret, a daughter of Llywelyn the Great.

1233

- Walter III de Clifford, with a force of 200 men, defends Bronllys Castle against his father-in-law, Llywelyn the Great.

1234

- January – Llywelyn the Great, in alliance with Richard Marshal, 3rd Earl of Pembroke, takes Shrewsbury.
- 21 June – Peace of Middle ends hostilities between Llywelyn the Great and the English Crown.
- Gilbert Marshal, 4th Earl of Pembroke, begins enlarging and further strengthening Pembroke Castle.

1238

- At Strata Florida Abbey, Welsh princes swear fealty to Dafydd ap Llywelyn as heir to Llywelyn the Great.

1240

- 11 April – Dafydd ap Llywelyn succeeds his father, Llywelyn the Great, as Prince of Gwynedd and Wales.
- 15 May – the Treaty of Gloucester is signed by Dafydd ap Llywelyn and Henry III.

1241

- 17 March – Dafydd sends representatives to Shrewsbury to discuss the ownership of disputed lands as required by the Treaty of Gloucester, though he absents himself. The meeting, and several others, prove fruitless.
- August – King Henry III of England invades Gwynedd.
- 29 August – the Treaty of Gwerneigron is signed by Dafydd ap Llywelyn and Henry III. In it, Dafydd agrees to cede most of modern-day Flintshire to Henry. Shortly thereafter, Dafydd hands over his half-brother, Gruffydd ap Llywelyn Fawr, to Henry for imprisonment in the Tower of London.

1244

- 1 March – after several years of imprisonment, Gruffudd ap Llywelyn Fawr dies in an escape attempt. Dafydd ap Llywelyn wages war in the Marches against Henry III.

1245

- March – Dafydd ap Llywelyn recovers much of Flintshire, including Mold Castle.
- August – Henry III of England invades Gwynedd. After being defeated in battle by Dafydd ap Llywelyn, he proceeds to Deganwy and refortifies the castle there.
- Autumn – Henry III withdraws to England.
- Following representations from Henry, the Vatican reverses its decision to recognise Dafydd as rightful ruler of Wales.

1246

- 25 February – Dafydd ap Llywelyn dies at Abergwyngregyn; he is succeeded by his nephews, Llywelyn ap Gruffudd and Owain ap Gruffudd.

1247

- 20 February – An earthquake damages St David's Cathedral.
- April – Llywelyn ap Gruffudd and his brother Owain Goch ap Gruffydd come to terms with King Henry III of England at Woodstock.
- December – Richard de Clare, 6th Earl of Gloucester, keeps a lavish Christmas court at his castle on the Welsh borders.

1252

- July – the earliest known document issued by Dafydd ap Gruffydd is drawn up; in it, he is referred to as 'lord of Cymydmaen'. From this point on Dafydd plays an increasingly important role in Welsh politics.

1255

- June – Llywelyn ap Gruffudd defeats his brothers Dafydd ap Gruffydd and Owain Goch ap Gruffydd at the Battle of Bryn Derwin.

1256

- November – Llywelyn ap Gruffudd crosses the River Conwy to take control of Gwynedd Is Conwy. With him is his brother Dafydd ap Gruffydd, who has been released from captivity.

1257

- June – A Norman army, sent to reclaim the lands taken from Rhys Fychan by his brother, Maredudd ap Rhys Grug, is defeated by Llywelyn ap Gruffudd at the Battle of Cymerau.

1258

- Llywelyn ap Gruffudd begins using the title "Prince of Wales"; a short-lived Cambro-Scottish treaty is concluded.

1260

- Approximate date of the building of the chapel at Manorbier Castle.

1262

- July – Following his father's death, Richard de Clare, 6th Earl of Gloucester, becomes the ward of Humphrey de Bohun, 2nd Earl of Hereford.

1263

- Dafydd ap Gruffydd enters an alliance with King Edward I of England.

1265

- 22 June – Treaty of Pipton establishes an alliance between Llywelyn ap Gruffudd and Simon de Montfort, 6th Earl of Leicester.

1267

- Under the terms of the Treaty of Montgomery, King Henry III of England recognises Llywelyn ap Gruffudd as Prince of Wales.

1268

- Gilbert de Clare, 6th Earl of Hertford, refuses to obey the King's summons to parliament, alleging that, his Welsh estates needed his presence for their defence against Llewelyn ap Gruffudd.
- Work begins on Caerphilly Castle.

1272

- English bishops Godfrey Giffard and Roger de Meyland negotiate with Llywelyn ap Gruffudd.
- Traditional construction date of fortified stone Monnow Bridge at Monmouth.

1274

- Dafydd ap Gruffydd allies himself with King Edward I of England, and conspires with Gruffydd ap Gwenwynwyn to assassinate Dafydd's brother Llywelyn.

1275

- Following her mother's death, Eleanor de Montfort begins her journey to Wales by sea for her marriage with Llywelyn ap Gruffudd. She is captured by "pirates" and taken prisoner by King Edward I of England.

1276

- King Edward I of England declares Llywelyn ap Gruffudd a rebel and marches on Wales.
- Llewelyn seizes Llanrwst, declaring it a "free borough" independent of the diocese of Llanelwy.

1277

- 24 June – Humphrey de Bohun, 3rd Earl of Hereford, convenes an army of Marcher lords at Worcester.
- Treaty of Aberconwy is signed by Edward I of England and Llywelyn ap Gruffudd.
- Llywelyn ap Gruffudd releases his elder brother, Owain Goch ap Gruffydd, from captivity.
- Edward I begins construction of castles at Aberystwyth (on a new site), Flint and Rhuddlan, in the latter case involving canalising part of the River Clwyd.

1278

- October – Llywelyn ap Gruffudd is formally married to Eleanor de Montfort at the door of Worcester Cathedral. King Edward I of England attends the ceremony and pays for the celebrations.

1280

- 6 October – Thomas Bek is consecrated as Bishop of St David's.
- Neath Fair and Llanidloes Market chartered.

1282

- Palm Sunday – Dafydd ap Gruffudd attacks Hawarden Castle.
- June – an English army is routed at the battle of Llandeilo.
- Autumn – Archbishop John Peckham unsuccessfully attempts to intercede between King Edward I of England and Llywelyn ap Gruffudd.
- 7 October – Edward I of England grants the lordship of Bromfield and Yale to John de Warenne, 6th Earl of Surrey, who begins construction of Holt Castle and laying out of a new English town of Holt.
- 6 November – An English army attempting to cross the Menai Strait from Anglesey is routed by Welsh forces in the battle of Moel-y-Don. In spite of the setback, English forces continue to make inroads into Gwynedd.
- 11 December – Death of Llywelyn ap Gruffudd at the Battle of Orewin Bridge in Cilmeri. Dafydd ap Gruffudd succeeds him as prince.

1283

- 18 January – Surrender of Dolwyddelan Castle.
- 25 April – Cynfrig ap Madog surrenders Castell y Bere to the English.
- 22 June – Dafydd ap Gruffudd is captured by King Edward I of England.
- 3 October (2?) – Dafydd ap Gruffudd is executed at Shrewsbury.
- Edward obliges the Cistercians of Aberconwy Abbey to relocate to Maenan Abbey to permit his erection of a castle and walled town at Conwy. He also begins work on the stone-built Caernarfon Castle.

1284

- 3 March – King Edward I of England enacts the Statute of Rhuddlan, promulgated on 19 March at Rhuddlan Castle, providing the constitutional basis for the government of the Principality of North Wales.
- August – Edward holds court at Abergwyngregyn.
- Edward holds the first "Round Table" tournament, at Nefyn.

1285

- May – The Cross of Neith, an important religious relic acquired from Wales, is carried through London at the head of a royal procession.
- 2 September – Isabella Mortimer, Countess of Arundel, marries, as her third husband, Robert de Hastang. She is subsequently fined the sum of £1,000 for having married without Royal Licence.

1286

- Manuscript B of the Annales Cambriae is completed, probably at the Cistercian abbey of Neath.

1287

- 8 June – Rhys ap Maredudd revolts in south-west Wales.

1288

- 20 January – Rhys ap Maredudd's revolt is finally suppressed as his final stronghold, the castle at Newcastle Emlyn, surrenders. Rhys goes to ground.

1289

- February – On attaining his majority, Richard FitzAlan is knighted and succeeds to his title of 8th Earl of Arundel.
- Construction work ends on Aberystwyth Castle.
- Harlech Castle is completed by King Edward I of England, at a total cost of £8,190.

1290

- Rebel William Cragh is captured by William de Braose, son of the Lord of Gower.

1294

- 30 September – Madog ap Llywelyn begins a revolt against King Edward I of England, claiming the title "Prince of Wales".
- 11 November – Madog defeats the forces of the earl of Lincoln in a pitched battle near Denbigh.
- 19 December – Madog issues the so-called Penmachno Document, the only surviving document drawn up by him in which he refers to himself as prince.

1295

- 5 March – Madog is defeated at the Battle of Maes Moydog.
- July – Madog surrenders.
- Beaumaris Castle on Anglesey begun.
- Roger Mortimer de Chirk builds Chirk Castle.

== Books ==
- Cadwgan of Llandyfai – De modo confitendi

== Births ==
1203

- date unknown – Eva Marshal, noblewoman (d. 1246)

1212

- April – Dafydd ap Llywelyn (probable; died 1246)

1222

- 4 August – Richard de Clare, 5th Earl of Hertford (d. 1262)

1224

- date unknown – Maud de Braose, Baroness Mortimer (d. 1301)
- probable – William de Braose, 1st Baron Braose (d. 1291)

1231

- date unknown – Roger Mortimer, 1st Baron Mortimer (d. 1282)

1282

- June – Gwenllian, only child of Llywelyn ap Gruffudd and Eleanor de Montfort (d. 1337)
- 7 August – Elizabeth of Rhuddlan, daughter of King Edward I of England (d. 1316)

1287

- 25 April – Roger Mortimer, 1st Earl of March (d. 1330)

1291

- 25 July – Hawys Gadarn, heiress (d. c. 1353)

== Deaths ==
1201

- 25 July – Gruffydd ap Rhys II, Prince of Deheubarth

1203

- May – Dafydd ab Owain Gwynedd, deposed Prince of Gwynedd

1209

- probable – Walter Map, writer

1211

- 9 August – William de Braose, 4th Lord of Bramber
- date unknown – Roger de Lacy, Constable of Chester

1212

- date unknown
  - Maredudd ap Cynan ab Owain Gwynedd, Welsh prince
  - Robert of Shrewsbury, Bishop of Bangor

1214

- 19 August – Roger Mortimer of Wigmore, Marcher lord

1215

- 17 November – Giles de Braose, Lord of Abergavenny and Bishop of Hereford

1216

- probable – Gwenwynwyn ab Owain, prince of Powys

1217

- 14 October – Isabel, Countess of Gloucester, 43?
- date unknown – Richard de Clare, 3rd Earl of Hertford, Marcher lord

1218

- 12 November – Henry de Abergavenny, Bishop of Llandaff

1219

- 14 May – William Marshal, 1st Earl of Pembroke

1220

- date unknown
  - Henry de Bohun, 1st Earl of Hereford
  - Isabel de Clare, 4th Countess of Pembroke

1221

- 17 January – Walter II de Clifford, Marcher lord

1223

- probable – Gerald of Wales, chronicler

1228

- June – Reginald de Braose

1229

- 10 October – Henry de Beaumont, 5th Earl of Warwick, Welsh landowner

1230

- 2 May – William de Braose (executed)
- date unknown – Maelgwn ap Rhys, Prince of Deheubarth

1231

- 6 April – William Marshal, 2nd Earl of Pembroke

1232

- 18 July – John de Braose, Lord of Bramber and Gower
- 26 October – Ranulf de Blondeville, 6th Earl of Chester, Marcher lord

1234

- 16 April – Richard Marshal, 3rd Earl of Pembroke
- date unknown – Rhys Gryg, Prince of Deheubarth

1236

- date unknown – Madog ap Gruffydd Maelor, founder of Valle Crucis Abbey

1237

- 2 February – Joan, wife of Llywelyn the Great
- 6 June – John of Scotland, Earl of Huntingdon, son-in-law of Llywelyn the Great

1240

- 11 April – Llywelyn the Great, Prince of Wales

1241

- 11 April – Cadwgan of Llandyfai, Bishop of Bangor
- date unknown – John Fitzalan, Lord of Oswestry

1244

- 1 March – Gruffydd ap Llywelyn Fawr, illegitimate son of Llywelyn the Great (fell to his death in an attempt to escape from the Tower of London)

1245

- 5 December – Anselm Marshal, 6th Earl of Pembroke

1246

- 25 February – Dafydd ap Llywelyn, Prince of Wales
- 6 August – Ralph de Mortimer, Marcher lord
- date unknown – Ednyfed Fychan, seneschal of Llywelyn the Great

1247

- date unknown
  - Hywel ab Ednyfed, Bishop of St Asaph
  - Odo of Cheriton, Latin author

1251

- date unknown
  - Eleanor de Braose, Countess of Hereford
  - Gwladus Ddu, daughter of Llywelyn the Great

1253

- date unknown – Elen ferch Llywelyn, daughter of Llywelyn the Great by Joan

1254

- 28 March – William de Ferrers, 5th Earl of Derby

1255

- 11 July – Thomas Wallensis, Bishop of St David's

1256

- Gruffudd ab Ednyfed, son of Ednyfed Fychan

1267

- October/November – Richard, bishop of Bangor

1268

- 17 October – Goronwy ab Ednyfed, seneschal of Gwynedd

1269

- date unknown – Gruffydd II ap Madog, Lord of Dinas Bran

1280

- 1 April – Richard de Carew, Bishop of St David's

1282

- 19 June – Eleanor de Montfort, Princess of Wales (in childbirth)
- 30 October – Roger Mortimer, 1st Baron Mortimer
- 11 December – Llywelyn ap Gruffudd, Prince of Wales (killed in battle)
- probable – Gruffudd Bola, Latin author

1283

- 3 October – Dafydd ap Gruffydd, Prince of Gwynedd (executed)
- date unknown – Goronwy ap Heilin, seneschal of Wales

1286

- Gruffydd ap Gwenwynwyn, prince of Powys

1289

- Gruffudd Fychan I, prince of Powys Fadog

1292

- Rhys ap Maredudd, lord of Dryslwyn and rebel leader (executed)

1293

- 12 May – Thomas Bek, Bishop of St David's

1294

- 17 January – Sir Roger de Puleston, Sheriff of Anglesey (lynched by a mob in Caernarfon)

1295

- 7 December – Gilbert de Clare, 6th Earl of Hertford
- date unknown – Cynan ap Maredudd, rebel leader

1296

- May – William de Valence, 1st Earl of Pembroke

1297

- 21 November – Roger de Mowbray, 1st Baron Mowbray, Norman lord and a leader in the Welsh wars

1298

- 31 December – Humphrey de Bohun, 3rd Earl of Hereford
- date unknown – William de Beauchamp, 9th Earl of Warwick, Norman lord and a leader in the Welsh wars

1299

- date unknown – John Giffard, sheriff of Gloucester
