= Isabel de Clare, 4th Countess of Pembroke =

Cambro-Irish noblewoman (c. 1172–1220)

Isabel de Clare
- suo jure Countess of Pembroke and Striguil
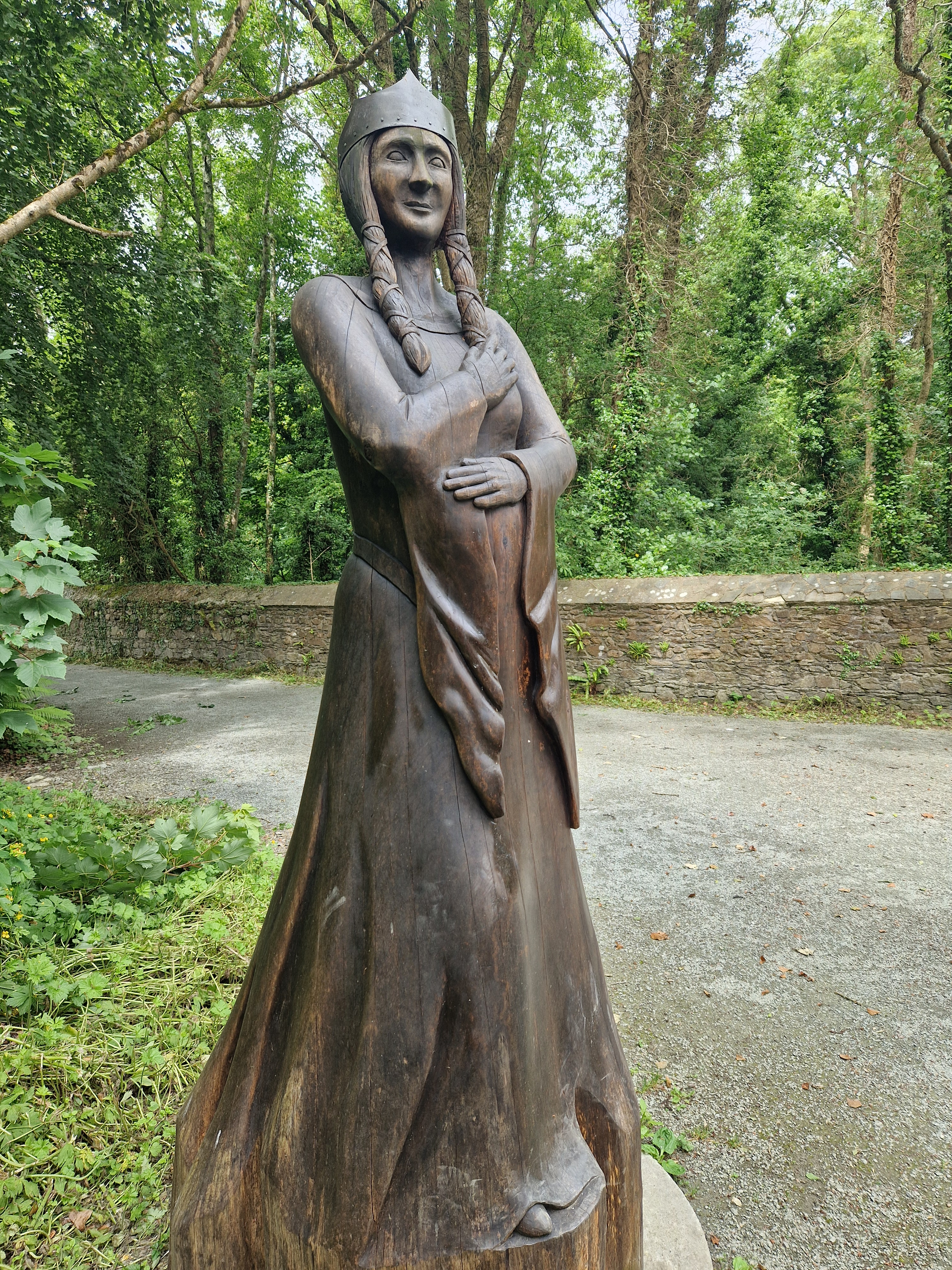
- Wooden statue of Isabel in the grounds of Tintern Abbey, County Wexford
- Born: c. 1172; Leinster
- Died: 11 March 1220; Chepstow, Wales
- Buried: Tintern Abbey, Monmouthshire
- Noble family: de Clare
- Spouse: William Marshal, 1st Earl of Pembroke (m. 1189; died 1219)
- Issue: William Marshal, 2nd Earl of Pembroke; Richard Marshal, 3rd Earl of Pembroke; Maud Marshal; Gilbert Marshal, 4th Earl of Pembroke; Walter Marshal, 5th Earl of Pembroke; Anselm Marshal, 6th Earl of Pembroke; Isabel Marshal; Sibyl Marshal; Joan Marshal; Eva Marshal
- Father: Richard de Clare, 2nd Earl of Pembroke
- Mother: Aoife of Leinster

Isabel de Clare, suo jure 4th Countess of Pembroke and Striguil (c. 1172 – 11 March 1220), was an Cambro-Norman and Irish noblewoman who was the daughter of Aoife MacMurrough and Richard de Clare and one of the wealthiest heiresses in Wales and Ireland. She was the wife of William Marshal, 1st Earl of Pembroke, who served four kings as Marshal of England. Her marriage had been arranged by King Richard I. She ruled Leinster as regent during the absence of her spouse in 1200–1203 and in 1207–1208.

== Family inheritance ==
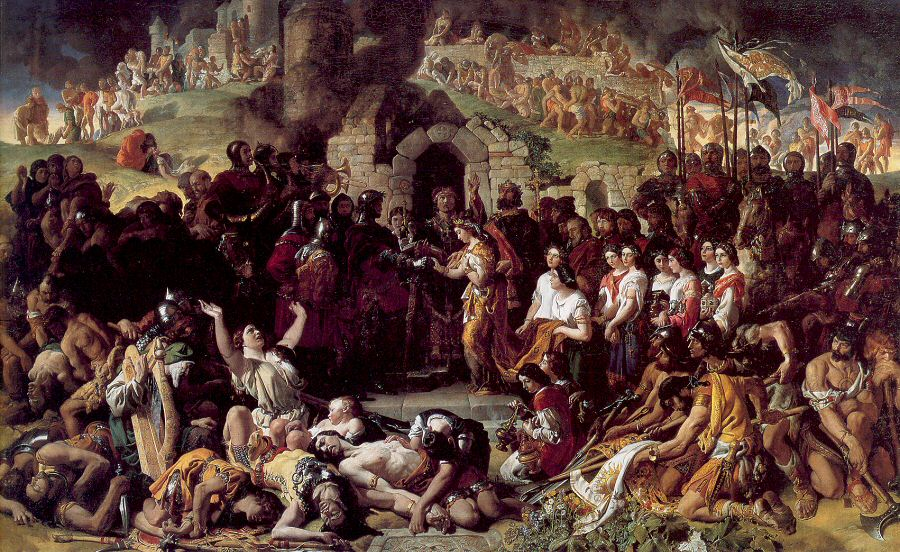
Daniel Maclise's painting of the marriage of Isabel's parents, Richard de Clare, 2nd Earl of Pembroke, and his wife Aoife of Leinster in August 1170, the day after the capture of Waterford.

Isabel was one of two known legitimate children of Earl Richard "Strongbow". Isabel may have been older than her brother Gilbert, who was born in 1173 but died a teenager soon after 1185, at which point Isabel became the heir to her parents' great estates in England, Wales and Leinster. Her mother was the daughter of Diarmait Mac Murchada, the deposed King of Leinster, and Mór Ní Tuathail. The latter was a daughter of Muirchertach Ua Tuathail and Cacht ingen Loigsig. The marriage of Strongbow and Aoife took place in August 1170, the day after the capture of Waterford by the Cambro-Norman forces led by Strongbow.

Isabel's paternal grandparents were Gilbert de Clare, 1st Earl of Pembroke, and his wife Isabel de Beaumont. Deprived of his father Gilbert's estate of Pembrokeshire by the king in 1153 when he succeeded as a child, Richard Strongbow continued to assert he was an earl, but took his title as Striguil (the Welsh name for the lordship of Chepstow, the centre of his estates in the southern March of Wales). The earldom of Pembroke was not forgotten, however, and in 1199 it was recreated and awarded to Isabel's husband, William Marshal, undoubtedly on the basis of Isabel's hereditary claim to it. In this way, Isabel could be said to be the successor in the earldom of Pembroke to her grandfather Gilbert, the first earl, especially as her husband before 1199 was meticulous in referring to her as 'Countess Isabel'.

Isabel was described as having been "the good, the fair, the wise, the courteous lady of high degree". She allegedly spoke French, Irish and Latin. After her brother Gilbert's death, Isabel became one of the wealthiest heiresses in the kingdom, owning besides the titles of Pembroke and Striguil, much land in Wales and Ireland. She also had a hereditary claim on the numerous castles on the inlet of Milford Haven, guarding the St George's Channel, including Pembroke Castle. She had her own personal seal, showing her in a dress, long mantle and pointed wimple whilst holding a falcon. A plaster cast of her seal is in the collection at the British Museum.

Isabel was a ward of King Henry II, who carefully watched over her inheritance, and who in 1189 had confided her to the keeping of Ranulf de Glanville, chief Justiciar of England.

== Marriage ==
The new King Richard I arranged her marriage in August 1189 to William Marshal, regarded by many as the greatest knight and soldier in the realm. Henry II had promised Marshal he would be given Isabel as his bride, and his son and successor Richard upheld the promise one month after his accession to the throne. At the time of her marriage, Isabel was still residing in the Tower of London in the protective custody of the Justiciar of England, Ranulf de Glanville. Following the wedding, which was celebrated in London "with due pomp and ceremony", they spent their honeymoon at Stoke d'Abernon in Surrey which belonged to Enguerrand d'Abernon. Marriage to Isabel elevated William Marshal from the status of military captain and knight into one of the richest men in the kingdom and imbued him with aristocratic prestige.

During the first few months of the marriage Isabel accompanied her husband, whilst he served King Richard I, to Normandy, crossing from Dover to Calais on 11 December 1189. William would serve as Lord Marshal of England, four kings in all: Henry II, Richard I, John, and Henry III. Although Marshal did not become Earl of Pembroke until 1199—a revival of the title by King John as an act of favour—he nevertheless assumed overlordship of Leinster in Ireland and the Marcher lordships of Chepstow and Usk with Isabel's many other estates in several English counties, which belonged to her father's and her own earldom of Striguil.

Marshal and Isabel did not sail to Ireland until 1200, after taking possession of Pembroke. This was the first time she had returned to Ireland since she was a child. Isabel remained in Ireland when her husband returned to England and while he fought in Normandy during 1202. She may have ruled Leinster in his absence till as late as 1203, with as her seneschal a Wiltshire knight, Geoffrey fitz Robert, who was married to Isabel's aunt, Basilia de Clare, a sister of Strongbow. Isabel is credited with playing a major part at this time in the foundation of the borough known as New Ross.

She again ruled Leinster in 1207-8 during her husband's house arrest at the court of King John in England when, though pregnant, she successfully led the campaign which defeated the rebel barons of the province led by Meiler FitzHenry.

William Marshal and Isabel produced a total of five sons and five daughters. Her husband died in 1219.

== Widowhood ==
Isabel lived as a widow for only ten months after the death of William Marshal, though it was by no means an uneventful period. She wrote within days to the papal legate and the justiciar of England asking for the prompt delivery of her lands, and on 18 June 1219, the justiciar issued writs ordering local officers to hand over to her control of her inheritance in four English counties and in Ireland. Pembroke is not mentioned, which hints that her eldest son may have directly inherited the earldom as it may have been treated as a royal grant to his father, not as part of his mother's inheritance. The marcher lordship of Striguil also came to her.

In July 1219 she was in France, where she successfully negotiated with King Philip Augustus the possession of her Norman inheritance and did homage to him. While there, she and her son opened negotiations with the king for the marriage of the younger William Marshal with his first cousin, a ploy which caused panic at the English court and a counter-offer of marriage to King Henry III's youngest sister Eleanor. There is evidence that she made good use of her eldest son as her agent in managing the great estates that were hers to dispose of in the months she had them, both of them stonewalling her late husband's executors to avoid paying the debts he left.

As a widow Isabel confirmed grants that had been made by her husband and extended some. She granted a water meadow to the abbey at Caversham and Henley-on-Thames.

In February 1220 Isabel was mortally ill at Chepstow, and on 2 March her son was at Cirencester en route to Wales to attend her deathbed. Tintern Abbey sources give her death as 11 March 1220. She was buried in the north choir aisle of the family abbey of Tintern, next to her mother Aoife.

== Issue ==
By her marriage she had ten children, five sons and five daughters:

- William Marshal, 2nd Earl of Pembroke (1190 – 6 April 1231), married (1) Alice de Béthune, daughter of Baldwin of Bethune; (2) 23 April 1224 Eleanor Plantagenet, daughter of King John of England. They had no children.
- Richard Marshal, 3rd Earl of Pembroke (1191 – 16 April 1234), married Gervaise de Dinan. He died in captivity. They had no children.
- Maud Marshal (1194 – 27 March 1248), married (1) Hugh Bigod, 3rd Earl of Norfolk, they had four children; (2) William de Warenne, 5th Earl of Surrey, they had two children.
- Gilbert Marshal, 4th Earl of Pembroke (1197 – 27 June 1241), married (1) Marjorie of Scotland, youngest daughter of King William I of Scotland; by an unknown mistress he had one illegitimate daughter:
  - Isabel Marshal, betrothed to Rhys ap Maelgwn Fychan (son of Maelgwn ap Rhys)
- Walter Marshal, 5th Earl of Pembroke (c. 1199 – November 1245), married Margaret de Quincy, Countess of Lincoln, granddaughter of Hugh de Kevelioc, 3rd Earl of Chester. No children.
- Isabel Marshal (9 October 1200 – 17 January 1240), married (1) Gilbert de Clare, 4th Earl of Hertford, whose daughter Isabel de Clare married Robert Bruce, 5th Lord of Annandale, the grandfather of Robert the Bruce; (2) Richard Plantagenet, Earl of Cornwall
- Sibyl Marshal (c. 1201 – 27 April 1245), married William de Ferrers, 5th Earl of Derby; they had seven daughters.
  - Agnes de Ferrers (died 11 May 1290), married William de Vesci.
  - Isabel de Ferrers (died before 26 November 1260)
  - Maud de Ferrers (died 12 March 1298), married (1) Simon de Kyme, (2) William de Vivonia (de Forz), and (3) Amaury IX of Rochechouart.
  - Sibyl de Ferrers, married Sir Franco de Bohun.
  - Joan de Ferrers (died 1267)
  - Agatha de Ferrers (died May 1306), married Hugh de Mortimer, of Chelmarsh.
  - Eleanor de Ferrers (died 26 October 1274), married (1) William de Vaux of Tharston and Wisset, (2) Roger de Quincy, Earl of Winchester, and (3) Roger de Leyburne of Elham.
- Eva Marshal (1203–1246), married William de Braose, Lord of Abergavenny
  - Isabella de Braose (born 1222), married Prince Dafydd ap Llywelyn. She died childless.
  - Maud de Braose (1224–1301), in 1247, she married Roger Mortimer, 1st Baron Mortimer and they had descendants.
  - Eva de Braose (1227 – 28 July 1255), married Sir William de Cantelou and had descendants.
  - Eleanor de Braose (c. 1228 – 1251). On an unknown date after August 1241, she married Sir Humphrey de Bohun and had descendants.
- Anselm Marshal, 6th Earl of Pembroke (c. 1208 – 22 December 1245), married Maud de Bohun, daughter of Humphrey de Bohun, 2nd Earl of Hereford. They had no children.
- Joan Marshal (1210–1234), married Warin de Munchensi (died 1255), Lord of Swanscombe
  - Joan de Munchensi (1230 – 20 September 1307) married William of Valence, the fourth son of King John's widow, Isabella of Angoulême, and her second husband, Hugh X of Lusignan, Count of La Marche. Valence was half-brother to Henry III and Edward I's uncle.

During Ireland's civil wars, William took two manors that the Bishop of Ferns claimed but could not get back. Some years after William's death, that bishop is said to have laid a curse on the family that William's sons would have no children and that William's estates would be scattered.

Each of Isabel's sons did become earl of Pembroke and marshal of England, and each died without legitimate issue. William's vast holdings were then divided among the husbands of his five daughters. The title of "Marshal" went to the husband of the oldest daughter, Hugh Bigod, 3rd Earl of Norfolk, and later passed to the Mowbray dukes of Norfolk and then to the Howard dukes of Norfolk, becoming "Earl Marshal" along the way. The title of "Earl of Pembroke" passed to William of Valence, the husband of Joan Marshal's daughter, Joan de Munchensi; he became the first of the de Valence line of earls of Pembroke.

Through his daughter Isabel, she is an ancestoress to both the Bruce and Stewart kings of Scots. Through his granddaughter Maud de Braose, she is an ancestoress to the last Plantagenet kings, Edward IV through to Richard III, and all English monarchs from Henry VIII and afterward.

== Legacy ==
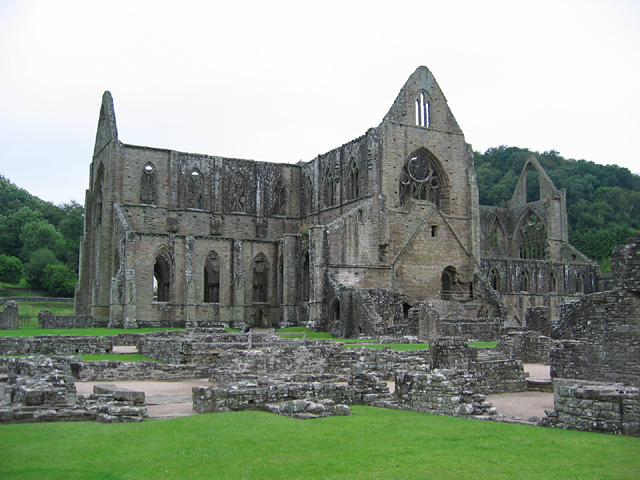
Tintern Abbey, the burial place of Isabel de Clare

A cenotaph was discovered inside St. Mary's Church, New Ross, Ireland, whose slab bears the partial inscription "ISABEL: LAEGEN" (interpreted as 'Isabel of Leinster'; standard Latin for "of Leinster" would be Lageniae) and an engraved likeness said to be hers. This identification was subsequently rejected, even before modern research identified her true burial place at Tintern

It was suggested in 1892 by Paul Meyer that Isabel might have encouraged the composition of the Song of Dermot, which narrates the exploits of her father and maternal grandfather. The Deeds of the Normans in Ireland as it is now known is dated by its latest editor to the 1190s, so Meyer's suggestion is possible. However the text makes no mention of either Isabel or her husband, and is more likely to have been sponsored within the community of barons of Leinster at a time before Isabel and William Marshal effectively exercised their lordship in Ireland in 1200.

Although her daughters had many children, Isabel's five sons, curiously, died childless, apart from Gilbert, who before he inherited the earldom had an illegitimate daughter he married off to a son of the Welsh lord Maelgwyn Fychan in 1240. This failure in heirs is supposedly attributed to a curse placed upon the Marshal family by the Irish Bishop of Ferns, Albin O'Molloy. The title of marshal subsequently passed to Hugh de Bigod, husband of Isabel's eldest daughter Maud, while the title of Earl of Pembroke went to William de Valence, 1st Earl of Pembroke, the husband of Joan de Munchensi, daughter of Joan Marshal. He was the first of the de Valence line of the earls of Pembroke.

Within a few generations their descendants included much of the nobility of Europe, including all the monarchs of Scotland since Robert I (1274–1329) and all those of England, Great Britain and the United Kingdom since Henry IV (1367–1413); and Katherine of Aragon and all of the English queen consorts of Henry VIII.

== Ancestry ==
Ancestors of Isabel de Clare, 4th Countess of Pembroke

16. Richard FitzGilbert, Lord of Clare
8. Gilbert FitzRichard, Lord of Clare
17. Rohese Giffard
4. Gilbert de Clare, 1st Earl of Pembroke
18. Hugh I, Count of Clermont-en-Beauvaisis
9. Adeliza de Clermont-en-Beauvaisis
19. Marguerite de Montdidier-Roucy
2. Richard de Clare, 2nd Earl of Pembroke
20. Roger de Beaumont
10. Robert de Beaumont, 1st Earl of Leicester
21. Adeline of Meulan
5. Isabel de Beaumont
22. Hugues I, Count of Vermandois
11. Élisabeth de Vermandois
23. Adélaïde, Countess of Vermandois
1. Isabel de Clare, 4th Countess of Pembroke
24. Murchad, King of Leinster
12. Donnchad, King of Leinster
25. Sadb ingen Mac Bricc
6. Diarmait, King of Leinster
26. Gille Michil mac Bráenáin
13. Orlaith ingen Ua Braenain
27. Uchdelb ingen Cernachán
3. Aoife MacMurrough, Princess of Leinster
28. Gilla Comgaill Ua Tuathail
14. Muirchertach Ua Tuathail
29. Sadbh Ní Domnail
7. Mór Ní Tuathail
30. Loigsig Ua Morda, King of Laois
15. Cacht Ní Morda, Princess of Laois
31. Gormlaith Ní Caellaide

== Sources ==
- Costain, Thomas (1962). The Conquering Family. Garden City, NY: Doubleday. ISBN 978-0-385-04088-4. OCLC 965113.
- Costain, Thomas (1951). The Magnificent Century: The Pageant of England. Doubleday.
- Crouch, David, "Testament and inheritance. The Lessons of the Brief Widowhood of Isabel, Countess of Pembroke", Law and Society in Later Medieval England and Ireland. Essays in Honour of Paul Brand, ed. Travis R. Baker (Abingdon: Routledge, 2018). pp. 25–50.
- Crouch, David (2016). William Marshal (Third ed.). Abingdon: Routledge. ISBN 9781138939325.
- Kenny, Gillian. "The Wife's Tale: Isabel Marshal and Ireland", William Marshal and Ireland, ed. J. Bradley and others (Dublin: Four Courts, 2017), pp. 315–324.
- Mitchell, Linda E., "The Most Perfect Knight's Countess, Isabella de Clare, her Daughters and Women's Exercise of Power", Medieval Elite Women and the Exercise of Power, 1100–1400, ed. H. Tanner (Palgrave Macmillan, 2019), pp. 45–65.
- Painter, Sidney (1933). William Marshal, Knight-errant, Baron, and Regent of England. Johns Hopkins historical publications. Johns Hopkins Press. ISBN 978-0-8018-0516-5.

Peerage of England
Preceded by Gilbert de Clare, 3rd Earl of Pembroke	Countess of Pembroke; 1185–1220	Succeeded by William Marshal, 2nd Earl of Pembroke
