= Maud de Braose, Baroness Mortimer of Wigmore =

Welsh noblewoman (1224–1301)

Maud de Braose
- Baroness Mortimer
- Born: 1224; Wales
- Died: shortly before 23 March 1301; Herefordshire, England
- Noble family: de Braose
- Spouse: Roger Mortimer, 1st Baron Mortimer of Wigmore
- Issue: Ralph Mortimer; Edmund Mortimer, 2nd Baron Mortimer of Wigmore; Isabella Mortimer, lady of Clun and Oswestry; Margaret Mortimer; Roger Mortimer, 1st Baron Mortimer of Chirk; William Mortimer
- Father: William de Braose
- Mother: Eva Marshal

Maud de Braose, Baroness Mortimer of Wigmore (1224 – shortly before 23 March 1301) was a noble heiress, and one of the most important, being a member of the powerful de Braose family which held many lordships and domains in the Welsh Marches. She was the wife of Roger Mortimer, 1st Baron Mortimer of Wigmore, a celebrated soldier and Marcher baron.

A staunch Royalist during the Second Barons' War, she devised the plan to rescue Prince Edward (the future King Edward I of England) from the custody of Simon de Montfort, 6th Earl of Leicester.

She was and is sometimes referred to as Matilda de Braose.

== Family ==
Maud was born in Wales in 1224, the second-eldest daughter and co-heiress of Marcher lord William de Braose and Eva Marshal. She was also a co-heiress to a portion of the Brewer estates, through her paternal grandmother Gracia, daughter of the prominent Angevine curialis William Brewer.

Maud had three sisters, Isabella, wife of Prince Dafydd ap Llywelyn; Eva, wife of William de Cantilupe; and Eleanor, wife of Humphrey de Bohun.

Her paternal grandparents were Reginald de Braose and Grecia de Briwere, and her maternal grandparents were William Marshal, 1st Earl of Pembroke, and Isabel de Clare, 4th Countess of Pembroke, daughter of Strongbow and Aoife of Leinster.

On 2 May 1230, when Maud was just six years old, her father was hanged by orders of Llewelyn the Great, Prince of Wales for alleged adultery with the latter's wife, Joan, Lady of Wales.

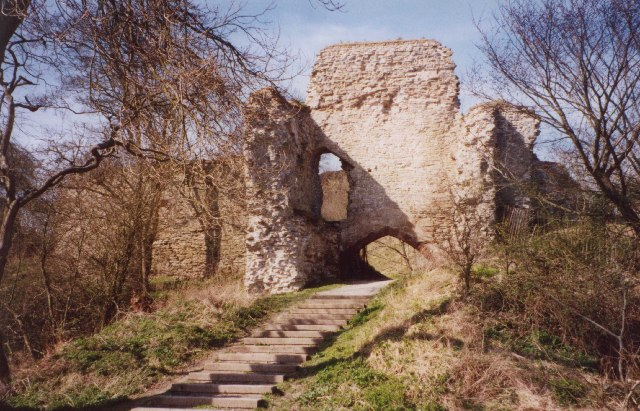
The ruins of Wigmore Castle, the principal residence of Maud de Braose and Roger Mortimer

== Marriage and inheritance ==
In 1247 Maud married Roger Mortimer of Wigmore. An old manuscript (written in Latin) describing the foundation of Wigmore Abbey recorded that Rog (secundus)...Radulphi et Gwladusae filius wedded Matildem de Brewys, filiam domini Willielmi de Brewys domini de Breghnoc. As the eldest son of Ralph de Mortimer and his Welsh wife, Princess Gwladys Ddu, Roger was himself a scion of another important Marcher family, and had succeeded his father in 1246, upon the latter's death. He was created 1st Baron Mortimer of Wigmore on an unknown date. Maud was seven years his senior, and they had been betrothed since childhood. He was the grandson of Llewelyn, Prince of Wales, the man who had ordered the execution of her father.

Maud's inheritance was one quarter of one third of the barony of Miles of Gloucester and the lordship of Radnor, Wales. On the occasion of their marriage, the honour of Radnor passed from the de Braose to the Mortimer family, and her marriage portion was some land at Tetbury which she inherited from her grandfather, Reginald de Braose. She also had inherited the Manor of Charlton sometime before her marriage, as well as four knight's fees in Ireland, which passed to Roger. Roger and Maud's principal residence was the Mortimers' family seat, Wigmore Castle in Herefordshire.

=== Issue ===
Roger and Maud together had at least six children:

- Ralph Mortimer (died 10 August 1274), Sheriff of Shropshire and Staffordshire (1273).
- Edmund Mortimer, 2nd Baron Mortimer of Wigmore (1251 – 17 July 1304), married Margaret de Fiennes, daughter of William II de Fiennes and Blanche de Brienne, by whom he had issue, including Roger Mortimer, 1st Earl of March.
- Margaret Mortimer (died September 1297), married Robert de Vere, 6th Earl of Oxford, by whom she had one son.
- Isabella Mortimer (died after 1300), married firstly, John Fitzalan, baron of Clun and Oswestry and de jure earl of Arundel (1246–1272), by whom she had issue; she married secondly, Robert de Hastang. She did not, as is incorrectly stated in Complete Peerage, marry Ralph d'Arderne.
- Roger Mortimer de Chirk (died 3 August 1326 Tower of London), married Lucy de Wafre, by whom he had one son. He was sentenced to life imprisonment for having participated in the Marcher rebellion (known as the Despenser War) in 1321–1322, along with his nephew, Roger, who led the revolt.
- William Mortimer (died before June 1297), first husband of Hawise de Muscegros, daughter and heir of Robert de Muscegros.

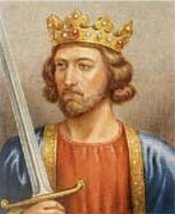
Prince Edward after becoming King Edward I of England. It was Maud de Braose who devised his escape from custody during the Second Barons' War.

== The Second Barons' War ==
=== Rescue of Prince Edward ===
Maud was described as beautiful and nimble-witted. She, like all medieval women, was expected to govern her husband's estates, manage his business affairs, arbitrate in tenants' disputes, and defend the family property during the times he was absent. These tasks Maud performed with great skill and efficiency.

During the Second Barons' War, she also proved to be a staunch Royalist and was instrumental in rallying the other Marcher lords to the side of King Henry III. It was Maud herself who devised a plan for the escape of Prince Edward after he had been taken hostage by Simon de Montfort, 6th Earl of Leicester following the Battle of Lewes. On 28 May 1265, when the Prince was held in custody at Hereford Castle, Maud sent a party of horsemen to carry him away to Wigmore Castle while he was out in the open fields, some distance from the castle, taking exercise by racing horses with his unsuspecting guardians as she had instructed him to do in the messages she had smuggled to him previously. At a signal from one of the horsemen, Edward galloped off to join the party of his liberators, and they escorted him to Wigmore Castle, twenty miles away, where Maud was waiting. She supplied the Prince with food and drink before sending him on to Ludlow Castle where he met up with the Earl of Gloucester who had defected to the side of the King.

=== Simon de Montfort ===
At the Battle of Evesham on 4 August 1265, Maud's husband Roger fought on the side of Prince Edward, and personally killed Simon de Montfort. As a reward, Roger was given de Montfort's severed head and other parts of his anatomy, including his genitals. Roger sent these gruesome trophies home to Wigmore Castle as a gift to Maud. The noted medieval historian Robert of Gloucester confirmed this by recording, To dam Maud the Mortimer that wel foule it ssende. She held a great feast that very night to celebrate the victory, and de Montfort's head was elevated in the Great Hall, still attached to the point of the lance.

== Legacy ==
In 1300, Maud is recorded as having presented to a vacant benefice in the Stoke Bliss parish church in Herefordshire, its advowson having originally belonged to the Mortimers, but was bequeathed to Limebrook Priory by Roger. Maud died on an unknown date shortly before 23 March 1301, and she was buried in Wigmore Abbey. Her husband Roger had died on 30 October 1282.

All the monarchs of England from 1413, as well as Mary, Queen of Scots, were directly descended from Maud, as is the current British royal family. Queen consorts Anne Boleyn, Jane Seymour, Catherine Howard, and Catherine Parr were also notable descendants of Maud de Braose through the latter's daughter Isabella, Countess of Arundel. Queen consorts Jane Seymour and Catherine Parr also descended from Maud's son, Edmund Mortimer, 2nd Baron Mortimer of Wigmore.

Maud de Braose was described by author Linda E. Mitchell as the "perfect example of a woman who obviated the restrictions her sex placed upon her and succeeded in placing herself squarely at the centre of the political milieu in the areas under her domestic control". Mitchell goes on to eulogise her as "one of the great architects of the late medieval March", which were the words used by Welsh historian R. R. Davies to sum up Maud's husband.

== Ancestry ==
Ancestors of Maud de Braose, Baroness Mortimer of Wigmore

William de Braose, 3rd Lord of Bramber
William de Braose
Bertha of Hereford
Reginald de Braose
Bernard de St. Valéry
Maud de St. Valéry
Matilda
William de Braose
Henry de Briwere
Sir William de Briwere
N.N. Walton
Grecia de Briwere
Hubert de Vallibus (Vaux), Baron of Gilsland
Beatrice de Vaux
Grecia
Maud de Braose
Gilbert Giffard
John Marshall
William Marshal, 1st Earl of Pembroke
Walter of Salisbury
Sibyl of Salisbury
Sibilla de Chaworth
Eva Marshal
Gilbert de Clare, 1st Earl of Pembroke
Richard de Clare, 2nd Earl of Pembroke "Strongbow"
Isabella de Meulan
Isabel de Clare, 4th Countess of Pembroke
Dermot MacMurrough, King of Leinster
Aoife of Leinster
Mor O'Toole

== Bibliography ==
- Costain, Thomas B. (1959). The Magnificent Century. Garden City, New York: Doubleday and Company, Inc.
- Crouch, David (2002), William Marshal: Knighthood, War and Chivalry, 1147–1219, London: Routledge
- Mitchell, Linda Elizabeth (2003). Portraits of Medieval Women: Family, Marriage and Politics in England 1225–1350. New York: Palgrave MacMillan
- Mortimer, Ian (2013). The Greatest Traitor: The Life of Sir Roger Mortimer, Ruler of England 1327–1330. Thomas Dunne Books. ISBN 9781466851399.
- Waugh, Scott L. (2014). The Lordship of England: Royal Wardships and Marriages in English Society and Politics, 1217-1327. Princeton University Press. ISBN 9781400859474.
