= Gwladus Ddu =

Welsh noblewoman (d. 1251)

- Born: Gwladus ferch Llywelyn
- Died: 1251; Windsor, Berkshire, England
- Family: Aberffraw
- Spouses: Reginald de Braose (m. c. 1215; died 1228); Ralph de Mortimer (m. c. 1230; died 1246)
- Issue: 4, including Roger
- Father: Llywelyn the Great
- Mother: Joan Plantagenet or Tangwystl ferch Llywarch

Gwladus Ddu, (lit. 'Gwladus the Black'), or Gwladus ferch Llywelyn (died 1251) was a member of the House of Aberffraw. She was a daughter of Llywelyn the Great of Gwynedd and probably Joan Plantagenet, Lady of Wales, the only known illegitimate daughter of John, King of England. Gwladus Ddu married two marcher lords, namely Reginald de Braose and Ralph de Mortimer.

Sources differ as to whether Gwladus was Llywelyn's legitimate daughter by his wife Joan or an illegitimate daughter by his longterm mistress Tangwystl ferch Llywarch Goch, the daughter of Llywarch Goch, and whilst she is widely regarded to be the daughter of Joan, this may be problematic when considering the date of Llywelyn and Joan's marriage (around 1204 or 1205) and the date of Gwladus' first marriage (about 1215). Gwladus is recorded in the Brut y Tywysogion as having died at Windsor in 1251.

== Marriage ==
Gwladus married firstly, Reginald de Braose, Lord of Brecon and Abergavenny in about 1215. After Reginald's death in 1228, she may have been the sister recorded as accompanying Dafydd ap Llywelyn to London in 1229.

She married secondly, Ralph de Mortimer of Wigmore in about June 1230. Ralph died in 1246, and their son, Roger de Mortimer, inherited the lordship.

== Children ==
Gwladus had at least three sons and a daughter with her second husband Ralph de Mortimer. The current British royal family claims descent from Llywelyn the Great through this line via their ancestor Roger Mortimer.

- Roger Mortimer, 1st Baron Mortimer of Wigmore (c. 1231 – 27 October 1282). In 1247 he married Maud de Braose, daughter of William de Braose, Lord of Abergavenny and Eva Marshal, with whom he had seven children.
- Hugh de Mortimer (d. 1273), lord of Chelmarsh.
- Peter John Mortimer, a Franciscan friar in Shrewsbury.
- Joan Mortimer, who around 1253 married Peter Corbet (d. 1300), lord of Caus, and had two sons, Thomas and Peter Corbet, 2nd Baron Corbet.

== Legacy ==
In the 1380s, when Roger Mortimer, 2nd Earl of March was considered a possible heir to King Richard II, Welsh bard Iolo Goch referred to his descent from Welsh royalty through Gwladus Ddu as a potential prophecy.

During the Wars of the Roses, both the House of Lancaster and House of York used Welsh mythological traditions to strengthen their cause. Edward IV claimed descent from the Kings of Gwynedd and Llewelyn the Great via the line of Gwladus Ddu through his grandmother Anne Mortimer to bolster his claim to the English throne.
