= Eleanor de Braose =

English noble

- Born: c. 1228
- Died: 1251
- Noble family: de Braose
- Spouse: Humphrey de Bohun
- Issue: Humphrey de Bohun, 3rd Earl of Hereford; Gilbert de Bohun; Alianore de Bohun; Margery de Bohun
- Father: William de Braose
- Mother: Eva Marshal

Eleanor de Braose (c. 1228 – 1251) was a Cambro-Norman noblewoman and a wealthy co-heiress of her father, who was the powerful Marcher lord William de Braose, and of her mother, Eva Marshal, a co-heiress of the Earls of Pembroke. Her husband was Humphrey de Bohun, heir of the 2nd Earl of Hereford, by whom she had children, including Humphrey de Bohun, 3rd Earl of Hereford and Gilbert de Bohun.

== Family ==
Eleanor was born in about 1228. She was the youngest of four daughters and a co-heiress of the powerful Marcher lord William de Braose, and Eva Marshal, both of whom held considerable lordships and domains in the Welsh Marches and Ireland. Eva was one of the daughters of William Marshal, 1st Earl of Pembroke by Isabel de Clare, 4th Countess of Pembroke, daughter of Richard de Clare, 2nd Earl of Pembroke, "Strongbow". Eleanor's three sisters were Isabella de Braose, Maud de Braose, Baroness Mortimer, and Eva de Braose, wife of William de Cantelou.

While Eleanor was a young girl, her father - known to the Welsh as Gwilym Ddu (Black William) - was hanged on the orders of Llewelyn the Great, Prince of Wales for alleged adultery with Llewelyn's wife, Joan, Lady of Wales. Following the execution, her mother held de Braose lands and castles in her own right.

== Marriage and issue ==
On an unknown date after August 1241, Eleanor became the first wife of Humphrey de Bohun, the son of Humphrey de Bohun, 2nd Earl of Hereford and Maud de Lusignan. The marriage took place after the death of Humphrey's mother, Maud.

Humphrey and Eleanor had the following children:

- Humphrey de Bohun, 3rd Earl of Hereford (c.1249- 31 December 1298), married Maud de Fiennes, daughter of Enguerrand II de Fiennes and Isabelle de Conde, by whom he had issue, including Humphrey de Bohun, 4th Earl of Hereford.
- Gilbert de Bohun (b.1251 - 1297) married Margarite and had issue, Gilbert (b.1302 d. 1381). His brother granted him Eleanor's lands in Ireland.
- Eleanor de Bohun (died 20 February 1314, buried Walden Abbey). She married Robert de Ferrers, 6th Earl of Derby on 26 June 1269. They had at least two sons and one daughter.
- Margery de Bohun (fl.1265 – 1280) married Theobald de Verdun and had a son also Theobald de Verdun, both of whom were hereditary Constables of Ireland.

Eleanor died in 1251, and was buried at Llanthony Secunda Priory. She passed on her considerable possessions in the Welsh Marches to her eldest son Humphrey. Her husband survived her, married Joan de Quincy, and died in 1265.
