= Of Shrewsbury =

Toponymic epithet

Of Shrewsbury is a toponymic epithet in reference to Shrewsbury. Notable persons with this byname include:

- Ralph of Shrewsbury (died 1363), English medieval bishop and university chancellor
- Richard of Shrewsbury, Duke of York (1473 – ?1483), second son of King Edward IV of England
- Robert of Shrewsbury (died 1212), English cleric, administrator, and judge of the Angevin period
- Robert of Shrewsbury (abbot) (died 1168), Benedictine monk, prior and later abbot of Shrewsbury Abbey

== See also ==
- Category:Abbots of Shrewsbury
- Category:Bishops of Shrewsbury
- Category:Earls of Shrewsbury
