= Joan, Princess of Wales =

Joan, Princess of Wales may refer to:

- Joan, Lady of Wales, illegitimate daughter of King John
- Joan, Countess of Kent, wife of Edward the Black Prince
