= Eva Marshal =

13th-century English Noblewoman (1203–1246)

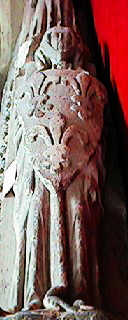
- Born: 1203; Pembroke Castle, Pembrokeshire, Wales
- Died: 1246 (aged 42–43)
- Noble family: Marshal
- Spouse: William de Braose
- Issue: Isabella de Braose; Maud de Braose; Eva de Braose; Eleanor de Braose
- Father: William Marshal, 1st Earl of Pembroke
- Mother: Isabel de Clare, 4th Countess of Pembroke

Eva Marshal (1203–1246) was an Anglo-Norman noblewoman, daughter of William Marshal and Isabel de Clare, the Earl and Countess of Pembroke. She married William de Braose, a marcher lord.

She held de Braose lands and castles in her own right following the public hanging of her husband by the orders of Llywelyn the Great, Prince of Wales.

== Family ==
Lady Eva was the 8th child of William Marshal, and she was a member of the Marshal family. Eva and her sisters were described as being handsome, high-spirited girls. From 1207 to 1212, Eva and her family lived in Ireland.

Her paternal grandparents were John Marshal and Sibyl of Salisbury, and her maternal grandparents were Richard de Clare, 2nd Earl of Pembroke, known to history as Strongbow and Aoife of Leinster, for whom she was probably named.

== Marriage ==
Sometime between 1219 and 1221, she married Marcher lord William de Braose, who in June 1228 succeeded to the lordship of Abergavenny, (Note: Although he held the lordship in tenancy, he never held the title Lord Abergavenny.) and by whom she had four daughters. William was the son of Reginald de Braose and his first wife Grecia Briwere. He was much hated by the Welsh who called him Gwilym Ddu or Black William.

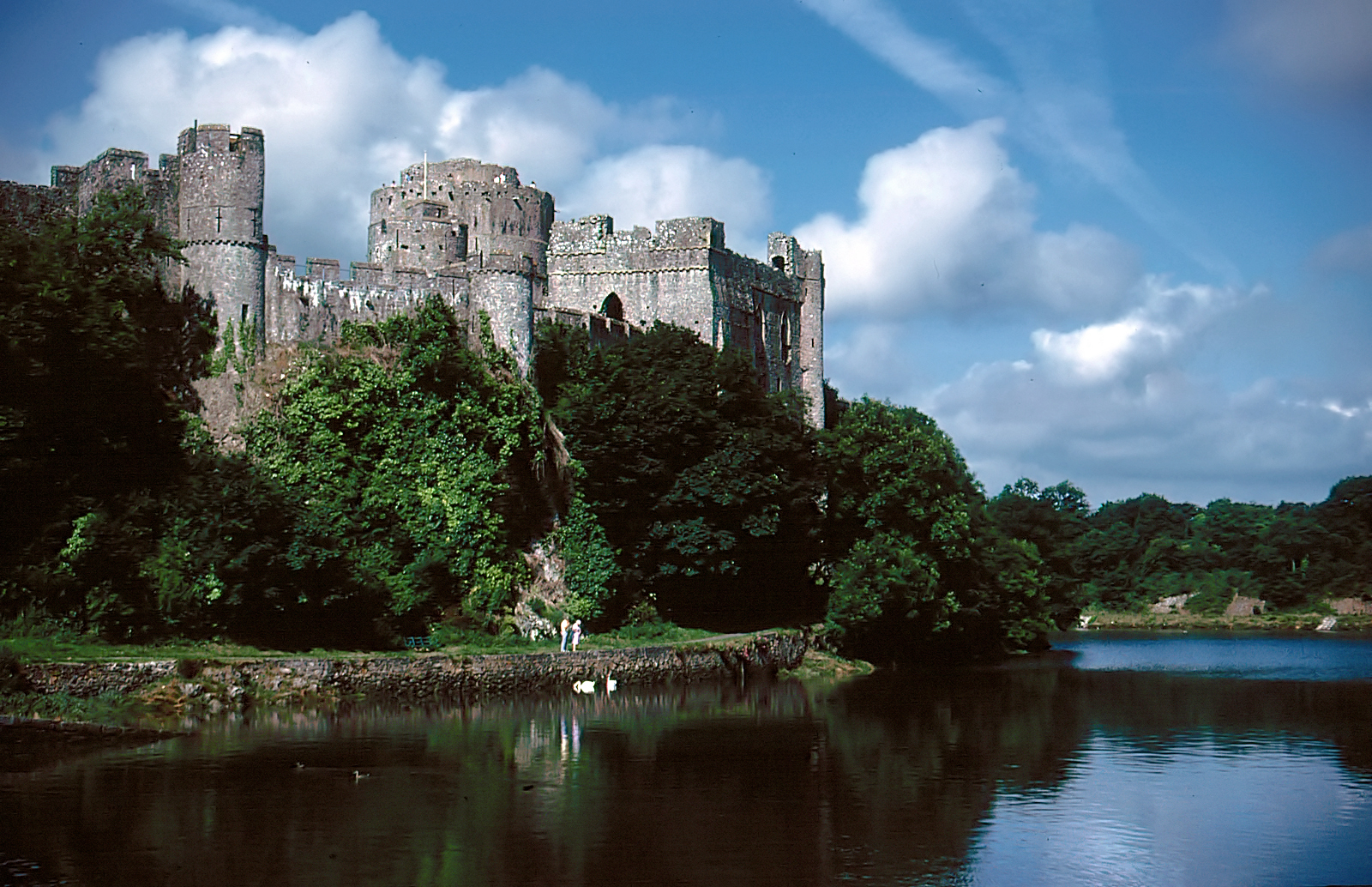
Pembroke Castle, Wales, the birthplace of Eva Marshal

=== Issue ===
- Isabella de Braose (b.1222), married Prince Dafydd ap Llywelyn. She died childless.
- Maud de Braose (1224–1301), in 1247, she married Roger Mortimer, 1st Baron Wigmore, by whom she had issue, including Edmund Mortimer, 2nd Baron Mortimer and Isabella Mortimer, Countess of Arundel.
- Eva de Braose (1227 – 28 July 1255), married William de Cantelou, by whom she had issue.
- Eleanor de Braose (c.1228 – 1251). On an unknown date after August 1241, she married Humphrey de Bohun. They had two sons, Humphrey de Bohun, 3rd Earl of Hereford and Gilbert de Bohun, and one daughter, Alianore de Bohun. All three children married and had issue. Eleanor was buried in Llanthony Secunda Priory.

== Widowhood ==
Eva's husband was captured by the Welsh forces of Prince Llywelyn the Great, in fighting in the commote of Ceri near Montgomery, in 1228. William was ransomed for the sum of £2,000 and then furthermore made an alliance with Llywelyn, arranging to marry his daughter Isabella de Braose to Llywelyn's only legitimate son Dafydd ap Llywelyn. He was publicly hanged by Llywelyn the Great, Prince of Wales on 2 May 1230 after being discovered in the Prince's bedchamber together with his wife Joan, Lady of Wales.

Several months later, Eva's eldest daughter Isabella married the Prince's son. Prince Llywelyn wrote to Eva shortly after the execution, offering his apologies, explaining that he had been forced to order the hanging due to the insistence by the Welsh lords. He concluded his letter by adding that he hoped the execution would not affect their business dealings.

Following her husband's execution, Eva held de Braose lands and castles in her own right. She is listed as holder of Totnes in 1230, which she held until her death. It is recorded on the Close Rolls (1234–1237) that Eva was granted 12 marks by King Henry III of England to strengthen Hay Castle. She had gained custody of Hay as part of her dower.

In early 1234, Eva was caught up in her brother Richard's rebellion against King Henry and possibly acted as one of the arbitrators between the King and her mutinous brothers following Richard's murder in Ireland. This is evidenced by the safe conduct she received in May 1234, thus enabling her to speak with the King. By the end of that month, she had a writ from King Henry granting her seisen of castles and lands he had confiscated from her following her brother's revolt. Eva also received a formal statement from the King declaring that she was back in "his good graces again".

She died in 1246 at the age of forty-three.

== Ancestry ==
Ancestors of Eva Marshal

8. Gilbert Giffard Marshal
4. John Marshal
9. N.N. de Venuz
2. William Marshal, 1st Earl of Pembroke
20. Edward of Salisbury
10. Walter of Salisbury
5. Sybil of Salisbury
22. Patrick of Chaources
11. Sybil of Chaources
23. Mathilde de Hesdin
1. Eva Marshal
24. Gilbert Fitz Richard
12. Gilbert de Clare, 1st Earl of Pembroke
25. Alice de Claremont
6. Richard de Clare, 2nd Earl of Pembroke
26. Robert de Beaumont, 1st Earl of Leicester
13. Isabel de Beaumont
27. Elizabeth de Vermandois
3. Isabel de Clare
28. Donnchadh mac Murchada, King of Leinster
14. Dermot MacMurrough, King of Leinster
29. Órlaith ingen Ní Bhraonáin
7. Aoife of Leinster
30. Muirchertach O'Toole (O'Tuathail), King of the Ui Muirdeaigh
15. Mor O'Toole
31. Cacht Inion Loigsig O'Morda

== Sources ==
- de Braose family genealogy
- Cokayne, G. E. The Complete Peerage
- Costain, Thomas B. (1959). The Magnificent Century. Garden City, New York: Doubleday and Company, Inc.
