= Eva de Braose =

English noblewoman

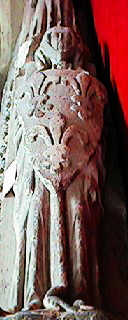
- Effigy of Eva de Braose in the Priory Church of St Mary, Abergavenny, covered by a shield displaying the arms of Cantilupe (ancient) and holding in both hands a heart
- Died: July 1255
- Buried: Abergavenny, Wales
- Noble family: de Braose
- Spouse: William de Cantilupe
- Issue: George de Cantilupe; Joan de Cantilupe; Milicent de Cantilupe
- Father: William de Braose
- Mother: Eva Marshal

Eva de Braose (fl. 1238 – July 1255) was one of the four co-heiresses of William de Braose. She was the wife of William de Cantilupe who, as a result of his marriage, acquired significant land holdings in both England and Wales.

== Family ==
Eva de Braose was one of the four daughters of William de Braose and Eva Marshal. Her sisters were Isabella, Maud, and Eleanor. William was the last of the Braose Marcher lords who possessed extensive lands in Wales, Herefordshire, Sussex and Devon. Eva Marshall was a daughter of William Marshal, 1st Earl of Pembroke. William de Braose was hanged by Llywelyn the Great, Prince of Gwynedd in 1230 and the four young sisters became co-heiresses of valuable property. All the sons of their maternal grandfather William Marshal died without heirs and in 1247 the Braose sisters each inherited a share of their mother's portion of the Marshal estates.

== Marriage and inheritance ==
As de Braose was a minor when her father died, her wardship was granted to William II de Cantilupe, the king's steward in 1238. By 1241 de Braose was married to William II de Cantilupe's son, William III de Cantilupe. As a result of this marriage, William III became lord of Abergavenny, a significant Marcher lordship.

The couple later gained more lands in south west England and Wales through her mother's Marshal inheritance. The Braose barony of Totnes in Devon and the Cantilupe baronies of Eaton Bray in Bedfordshire and Bulwick in Northamptonshire also came under their control.

Eva de Braose and William III de Cantilupe had three children:

- George de Cantilupe (1251– 1273)
- Joan de Cantilupe (d 1271) married Henry de Hastings (1235–1269).
- Millicent de Cantilupe (died 1299) married (1) John de Montalt; (2) Eudo de la Zouche (died 1279)

William de Cantilupe died in September 1254 and de Braose in July the following year.

After his parents' deaths, George gained possession of all their estates. He died childless in 1273 and the lands were divided between his two sisters. The barony of Abergavenny descended through Joan to the Hastings family while Totnes and the Cantilupe estates became possessions of Millicent's de la Zouche heirs.
