= William Bendings =

English judge and county sheriff

William Bendings (died c.1197) was an English judge and county sheriff.

According to Gerald of Wales, Bendings was sent to Ireland by Henry II in 1176 as one of four envoys, of whom two were to remain with the viceroy, Richard FitzGilbert, Earl of Striguil, and two were to return, bringing with them Reimund Fitzgerald, whose exploits had aroused the king's jealousy. Reimund did not at once comply with the royal mandate, being compelled by the threatening attitude of Donnell to march to the relief of Limerick, a town which he had only recently taken. Richard also died that year, and the four envoys appear to have returned to England without Reimund.

In 1178 Bendings was a royal justice in Yorkshire. In 1179, on the resignation of the chief justice, Richard de Lucy, a redistribution of the circuits was carried into effect. In place of the six circuits then existing the country was divided into four, to each of which, except the northern circuit, five judges were assigned, three or four of the number being laymen. To the northern circuit six judges were assigned, of whom Bendings was one, having for one of his colleagues the celebrated Ranulf Glanvill, who was made chief justice the following year. Bendings is named as a royal justice in a November 1179 fine made at Westminster. In 1183-4 we find him acting as sheriff of Dorset and Somerset, the two counties being united under his single jurisdiction. There seems to be no reason to suppose, with Edward Foss, that the expression, 'sex justitiæ in curia regis constituti ad audiendum clamores populi', applied to the six judges of the northern circuit, imports any jurisdiction peculiar to them.

Bendings was survived by his wife, Gunnora, and a son, Adam. The date of his death is uncertain: he was living in 1189–90, since he is entered in the 1189-90 pipe roll as rendering certain accounts to the exchequer. However, he seems to have died by 1196/7, when his son Adam started accounting for debts his father had incurred as sheriff of Dorset and Somerset.
