= Siwan (play) =

1956 play by Saunders Lewis

Siwan is a play written in the Welsh language by Saunders Lewis, first produced in 1956. The first English language translation of the play (sometimes known by the alternative title The King of England’s Daughter) appeared in 1960.

The play is based on historical events and centres on Joan, Lady of Wales, the illegitimate daughter of King John of England and her marriage to Llywelyn ab Iorwerth (also known as Llywelyn Fawr or Llywelyn the Great). It is set at the royal home at Abergwyngregyn, on the north coast of Gwynedd at Easter in 1230. In the play William de Braose, a young Marcher Lord, is discovered with Siwan in Llywelyn's bedchamber. De Braose is hanged for adultery.

In Saunders Lewis' earlier work including the play Blodeuwedd (1948), he had been increasingly using the themes and characters of Welsh myths and historical events as the inspiration for his work. He continued the use of medieval romantic themes in Siwan which also deals with adultery, but in contrast to Blodeuwedd also involves the themes of reconciliation, forgiveness, and marital harmony.

Siwan and Blodeuwedd (play) are considered as "canonical examples of Welsh language drama" and are regularly performed in Welsh theatres and on Welsh-language radio and television.

== See also ==
- Gwynfor Evans, Cymru O Hud, Abergwyngregyn p. 76
