= Robert of Shrewsbury =

English cleric, administrator and judge (died 1212)

- Bishop of Bangor
- Church: Roman Catholic
- Diocese: Bangor
- Appointed: 1197
- Predecessor: Alan ab Ins
- Successor: Cadwgan of Llandyfai

Orders
- Consecration: 16 March 1197 (probable)

Personal details
- Died: 1212 Shrewsbury, England
- Occupation: Cleric, administrator, judge

Robert of Shrewsbury (died 1212) was an English cleric, administrator, and judge of the Angevin period. His career culminated in his appointment as Bishop of Bangor.

== Origins ==
Robert seems to have had strong local connections with Shrewsbury and owned property in the town, so he may have originated in Shrewsbury or Shropshire, as his toponymic byname suggests. He had a brother called Richard, who was archdeacon of Shrewsbury, suggesting that they formed part of a local landowning family. In view of their later careers, both must have followed a course of study including literature and law, typically provided by a cathedral school.

== Career ==
=== Royal official ===
Robert was a King's clerk and royal justice in the reign of Henry II. Some of the cases in which he was involved are known. For example, on 11 February 1189, Robert was one of the justiciars who helped settle a suit precipitated by an assize of novel disseisin concerning Lilleshall Abbey over disputed land at Hencott, north of Shrewsbury. A year or two later, he was a justiciar in a long-running case involving land at Longford.

=== Ecclesiastical appointments ===
Robert was made Dean of St Mary's College, Shrewsbury. The Victoria County History lists him as occurring as dean between 1186 and 1200, although he is unaccountably missing from the list of deans in Owen and Blakeway's account of religious houses in Shrewsbury. St Mary's was a royal free chapel and was to evolve into a Royal Peculiar, independent of the local Diocese of Lichfield. As such, it was essentially in the gift of the king and most of its medieval deans were royal clerks. Substantial additions were made to the church building during his incumbency and that of Henry of London, another royal clerk and justice who held the deanery in the early 13th century.

Robert was also a prebendary of the church at Wolverhampton, then dedicated to the Virgin Mary but now St Peter's Collegiate Church. This was another royal free chapel, where appointments were given as gifts by the king. This royal favour seems to have persisted into the reign of Richard I.

=== The network of alliances ===
As both a justice and a cleric, as well as a local landed grandee, Robert was greatly in demand as a witness in property transactions, especially those involving transfers of land and privileges to the Church. These cluster around the interests of the powerful Fitz Alan family and their allies, who dominated Shropshire in the 12th century, and with whom Robert was evidently on good terms. About 1190 he witnessed an agreement by which William Fitz Alan and his heirs rented land at Henley and advowson of Tasley chapel, both parts of Morville, near Bridgnorth, from Shrewsbury Abbey. At about the same time Fitz Alan also gave the advowson of Oswestry church to Shrewsbury Abbey. Between 1204 and 1210 Robert was witness to a charter of Reiner, Bishop of St Asaph, confirming the grant.

Several times he helped in donations to Wombridge Priory, a small Augustinian house founded by the Hadley family, vassals and close friends of the Fitz Alans. Probably in 1186-7 Robert witnessed a charter by which Madoc, son of Gervase Goch, donated advowson of Sutton Maddock church to Wombridge Priory. Later he was witness to a charter by which William of Hadley gave land to the Priory. Probably in the 1190s he witnessed John de Cambrai gave a virgate and eight acres of land, as well as a meadow, at Wappenshall in his manor of Lee Cumbray (now Leegomery), north-west of Hadley. Around 1196 he and Richard, his brother, witnessed a deed by which Galiena, widow of Roger Musson, gave the Priory half a virgate of land in frankalmoin at Harrington in Sutton Maddock.

To this web of alliance with local and regional magnates, Robert seems to have added some influence with the most powerful of allies: Hubert Walter, the Archbishop of Canterbury, who acted as Chief Justiciar, effectively regent for the absent King Richard I. The Pipe Roll for 1195 has an addendum showing accounts for the royal silver mine at Carreghofa, which was administered by Joseph Aaron, the archbishop's clerk. This shows that Robert had been appointed custos or guardian of the mine and paid the large sum of £16 14s. for his services. This appointment must have complemented one of his other known appointments of the 1190s - as warden of Shrewsbury mint. As he was literally making money, Robert must have prospered greatly in this period, with access to numerous emoluments and perquisites.

=== Bishop ===
Robert was appointed Bishop of Bangor by Hubert Walter, apparently without being elected. Giraldus Cambrensis, another of Henry II's officials, but now out of favour, remarked on the lack of canonical election in his autobiography. He was consecrated by the archbishop in 1197, probably on 16 March. Giraldus, contesting the bishopric of St David's against one of Hubert Walter's's nominees, records his own support for the efforts of a person named only as "R.", Cistercian subprior of Aberconwy Abbey, to be recognised as the true bishop-elect of Bangor. As Robert refused to resign his earlier appointments, he was attacked by Peter of Blois, the Dean of Wolverhampton, another close supporter of Henry II, who was now out of favour. Peter wrote to Robert, denouncing his pluralism in strong terms and commending the virtues of apostolic poverty, although Peter himself had a long record of holding benefice in plurality – a practice increasingly regarded as unacceptable by the Church.

It is not known whether Robert actually was shamed into resigning his earlier benefices, but he does seem to fade out of the picture at St Mary's, Shrewsbury, about the turn of the century. Thereafter, William Lestrange appears as dean, although his dates are uncertain, and in 1203 Henry of London was appointed to the post. At Wolverhampton, Peter of Blois took his belated reforming programme further, claiming that the negligence and nepotism of the prebendaries "brought forth hissing and derision from the entire population." Hubert Walter dissolved the college and King John conferred the prebends on him in 1203 in order that he could endow a new Cistercian abbey on the site. The whole venture ultimately came to nothing, but it seems likely Robert lost his prebend in the process if he did not resign it earlier. However, he was not an energetic bishop at Bangor, being non-resident for most of his episcopate.

== Last years and death ==
Robert had been inserted into the diocese of Bangor by an archbishop of Canterbury, backed by a king of England. However, his episcopate coincided with the renascence of the Principality of Gwynedd under Llywelyn the Great. The death of Hubert Walter in 1205 removed Robert's most important patron and initiated a dispute over the succession to the archdiocese of Canterbury that led to the imposition of an interdict on the whole country and excommunication of King John personally. William Fitz Alan, Robert's chief regional supporter, died in 1210, leaving his lands to his eldest son, also William, a minor, from whom King John demanded a huge fine before he could enter into his inheritance. This pushed the Fitz Alans decisively into the emerging baronial opposition to John and they became allies of Llywelyn, who had initiated hostilities against John earlier in the year.

In 1211, John of England summoned the Welsh leaders to meet him at Chester, demanding expressions of loyalty. Most acceded. It was possibly on this occasion that Robert refused to meet him, giving John's excommunication as an excuse. In May John invaded north Wales, driving Llywelyn's forces back into Gwynedd. Overstretched supply lines forced John to withdraw, but in July he returned with his army. John retaliated against the recalcitrant Robert by sending a troop of soldiers from Brabant to Bangor. They burnt the city and on this occasion, Bishop Robert was present in his cathedral. They abducted him from the high altar. Robert had to pay a fine of two hundred hawks, then an important Welsh export, to recover his liberty. Lloyd comments: "it is hardly fanciful to suppose that it was the result of this outrage that Robert died in the following year."

Robert certainly died in 1212, although some older sources say 1213. He was buried at Shrewsbury.

== Footnotes ==
Catholic Church titles
Preceded by Richard	Dean of St Mary's Church, Shrewsbury c.1186–c.1200	Succeeded by William Lestrange or Henry of London
Preceded by Alan or Alban, former Prior of St John of Jerusalem	Bishop of Bangor; 1197–1212	Succeeded by Cadwgan of Llandyfai, also known as Martin
