= Roger Mortimer, 1st Baron Mortimer of Wigmore =

English baron

Roger Mortimer
- Baron Mortimer of Wigmore
- Arms of Mortimer: Barry or and azure, on a chief of the first two pallets between two base esquires of the second over all an inescutcheon argent
- Born: c. 1231
- Died: 27 October 1282 (aged c. 50–51); Kingsland, Herefordshire
- Buried: Wigmore Abbey
- Noble family: Mortimer
- Spouse: Maud de Braose
- Issue: Ralph Mortimer; Edmund Mortimer, 2nd Baron Mortimer of Wigmore; Isabella Mortimer, lady of Clun and Oswestry; Margaret Mortimer; Roger Mortimer, 1st Baron Mortimer of Chirk; William Mortimer
- Father: Ralph de Mortimer
- Mother: Gwladys Ddu

Roger Mortimer, 1st Baron Mortimer of Wigmore (c. 1231 – 27 October 1282), of Wigmore Castle in Herefordshire, was a marcher lord who was a loyal ally of King Henry III of England and at times an enemy, at times an ally, of Llywelyn ap Gruffudd, Prince of Wales.

== Early career ==
Born in 1231, Roger was the son of Ralph de Mortimer and his Welsh wife, Gwladys Ddu, daughter of Llywelyn ab Iorwerth and Joan Plantagenet, daughter of John, King of England.

In 1256 Roger went to war with Llywelyn ap Gruffudd when the latter invaded his lordship of Gwrtheyrnion or Rhayader. This war would continue intermittently until the deaths of both Roger and Llywelyn in 1282. They were both grandsons of Llywelyn ab Iorwerth.

Mortimer fought for the King against the rebel Simon de Montfort, 6th Earl of Leicester, and almost lost his life in 1264 at the Battle of Lewes fighting Montfort's men. In 1265 Mortimer's wife, Maud de Braose helped rescue Prince Edward; and Mortimer and the Prince made an alliance against de Montfort.

== Victor at Evesham ==
In August 1265, de Montfort's army was surrounded by the River Avon on three sides, and Prince Edward's army on the fourth. Mortimer had sent his men to block the only possible escape route, at the Bengeworth bridge. The Battle of Evesham began in earnest. A storm roared above the battle field. Montfort's Welsh soldiers broke and ran for the bridge, where they were slaughtered by Mortimer's men. Mortimer himself killed Hugh Despencer and Montfort, and crushed Montfort's army. Mortimer was awarded Montfort's severed head and other parts of his anatomy, which he sent home to Wigmore Castle as a gift for his wife, Lady Mortimer.

== Welsh wars and death ==
Llewellyn's objections to Mortimer's construction of a new castle Cefnllys contributed to the climate of distrust that preceded Edward I's 1282 campaign. During the war, Mortimer was put in charge of operations in mid-Wales. It was a major setback for Edward when Mortimer died in October 1282.

== Marriage and children ==
His wife was Maud de Braose, daughter of William de Braose, Lord of Abergavenny by Eva Marshal. Roger Mortimer had married Maud in 1247. She was, like him, a scion of a Welsh Marches family. Their seven known children were:

1. Ralph Mortimer, died 10 August 1274, Sheriff of Shropshire and Staffordshire.
2. Edmund Mortimer, 2nd Baron Mortimer (1251–1304), married Margaret de Fiennes, the daughter of William II de Fiennes and Blanche de Brienne. Had issue, including Roger Mortimer, 1st Earl of March
3. Isabella Mortimer, died 1292. She married (1) John Fitzalan (1246–1272), and (2) Robert de Hasting;
4. Margaret Mortimer, died 1297. She married Robert de Vere, 6th Earl of Oxford
5. Roger Mortimer, 1st Baron Mortimer of Chirk, died 1326.
6. Geoffrey Mortimer, died 1273.
7. William Mortimer (c. 1259 – before June 1297), was hostage for his father in 1264. He was knighted, and married Hawise, daughter and heir of Robert de Mucegros. Died childless.

Their eldest son, Ralph, died in his youth. The second son, Edmund, was recalled from Oxford University and appointed his father's heir.

== Epitaph ==
Roger Mortimer died on 27 October 1282 at Kingsland, Herefordshire, and was buried at Wigmore Abbey, where his tombstone read:

Here lies buried, glittering with praise, Roger the pure, Roger Mortimer the second, called Lord of Wigmore by those who held him dear. While he lived all Wales feared his power, and given as a gift to him all Wales remained his. It knew his campaigns, he subjected it to torment.

== Ancestry ==
Ancestors of Roger Mortimer, 1st Baron Mortimer of Wigmore

8. Hugh de Mortimer
4. Roger Mortimer of Wigmore
9. Matilda le Meschin
2. Ralph de Mortimer
10. Walchelin de Ferriers
5. Isabel de Ferrers of Wigmore castle
11. Goda de Toeni or Tosni
1. Roger Mortimer, 1st Baron Mortimer of Wigmore
12. Iorwerth Drwyndwn
6. Llywelyn ab Iorwerth
13. Marared ferch Madog or Margred verch Madog
3. Gwladys Ddu or Gwladys verch Llewelyn
14. John, King of England
7. Joan Plantagenet or Joan, Lady of Wales or Siwan
15. Clemence

== Sources ==
- Mortimer, Ian. The Greatest Traitor: The Life of Sir Roger Mortimer, 1st Earl of March, Ruler of England 1327-1330, Jonathan Cape, London, 2003. ISBN 0-224-06249-2
- Remfry, P.M., Wigmore Castle Tourist Guide and the Family of Mortimer (ISBN 1-899376-76-3)
- Remfry, P.M., Brampton Bryan Castle, 1066 to 1646 (ISBN 1-899376-33-X)
- Dugdale, Sir William The Baronage of England, Vol. 1, 1661.

Peerage of England
New creation	Baron Mortimer of Wigmore	Succeeded by Edmund Mortimer
