= William de Braose (died 1230) =

13th-century Welsh nobleman

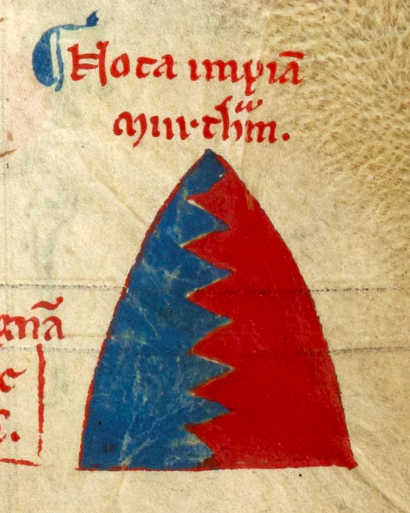
Arms attributed to William de Braose by Matthew Paris: Party per pale indented gules and azure. Marginal drawing of an inverted shield referring to his Nota impiam murthram ("impious murder")

William de Braose (c. 1197–1204 – 2 May 1230) was the son of Reginald de Braose by his first wife, Grecia Briwere. He was an ill-fated member of the House of Braose, a powerful and long-lived dynasty of Marcher Lords.

== Biography ==
William de Braose was born in Brecon, probably between 1197 and 1204. The Welsh, who detested him and his family name, called him Gwilym Ddu, Black William. He succeeded his father in his various lordships in 1227, including Abergavenny and Buellt.

William was captured by the Welsh forces of Prince Llywelyn the Great, in fighting in the commote of Ceri near Montgomery, in 1228. As part of the price of his ransom, William agreed to marry his daughter Isabella de Braose to Llywelyn's only legitimate son Dafydd ap Llywelyn. However, while in captivity William had an affair with Llywelyn's wife, Joan, Lady of Wales. Invited by Llywelyn to Easter festivities in 1230, William renewed the liaison with Joan and was caught in flagrante delicto with her. Llywelyn had him hanged on 2 May 1230.

== Wife and family ==
William married Eva Marshal, daughter of William Marshal, 1st Earl of Pembroke. They had four daughters:

- Isabella de Braose (born c. 1222 – 1248), wife of Prince Dafydd ap Llywelyn
- Maud de Braose (born c. 1224 – 1301), wife of Roger Mortimer, 1st Baron Mortimer another very powerful Marcher dynasty.
- Eleanor de Braose (c. 1226 – 1251), wife of Humphrey (son of Humphrey de Bohun) and mother of Humphrey de Bohun, 3rd Earl of Hereford.
- Eva de Braose (c. 1227 – July 1255), wife of William de Cantilupe (died 1254).

== Legacy ==
With William's death by hanging and his having four daughters, who divided the de Braose inheritance among them, the titles now passed to the junior branch of the de Braose dynasty. The only male heir was now John de Braose who had already inherited the titles of Gower and Bramber from his father Reginald de Braose.

== Literature ==
- Sion Eirian – The Royal Bed (play) 2015 adaptation and Siwan (play)
- Saunders Lewis – Siwan
- Thomas Parry – Llywelyn Fawr (play)
- Edith Pargeter – The Green Branch (novel)
- Sharon Penman – Here Be Dragons (novel)
