= Richard de Clare, 2nd Earl of Pembroke =

Anglo-Norman lord in Ireland (c. 1130–1176)

Richard de Clare
- 2nd Earl of Pembroke
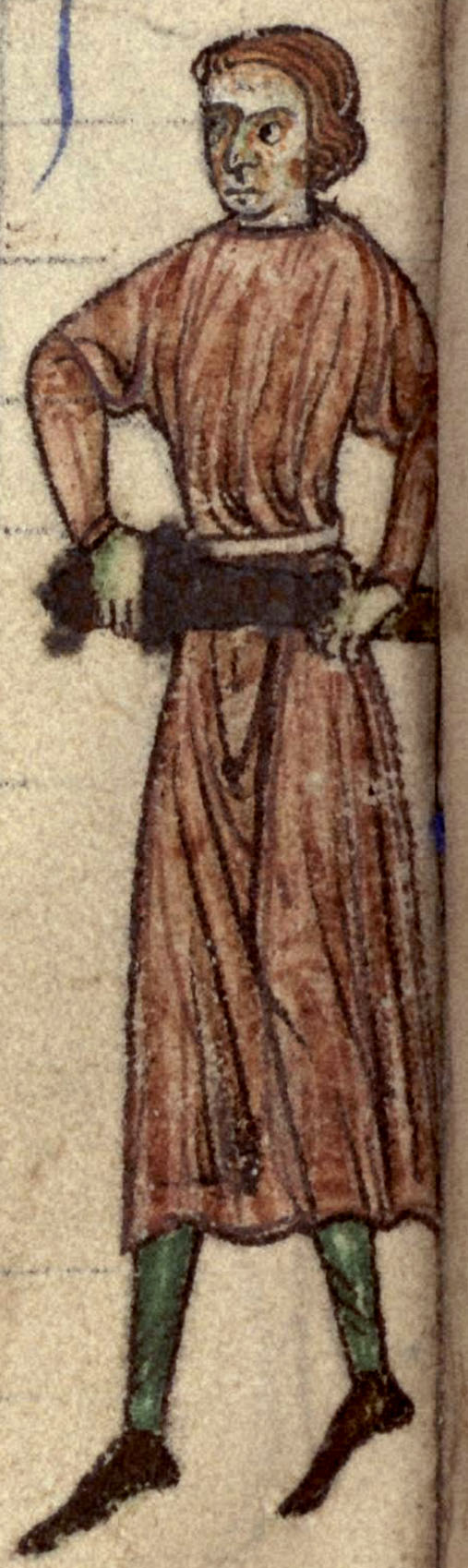
- Depiction by Gerald of Wales in Topographia Hibernica, c. 1188
- Other names: Strongbow
- Born: c. 1130; Tonbridge, Kent, England
- Died: 20 April 1176 (aged 45 or 46); Dublin, Ireland
- Buried: Christ Church Cathedral, Dublin
- Noble family: de Clare
- Spouse: Aoife MacMurrough
- Issue Detail: Gilbert de Clare, 3rd Earl of Pembroke; Isabel de Clare, 4th Countess of Pembroke
- Father: Gilbert de Clare, 1st Earl of Pembroke
- Mother: Isabelle of Beaumont

The de Clare Coat of Arms

Richard de Clare (c. 1130 – 20 April 1176), the second Earl of Pembroke, also Lord of Leinster and Justiciar of Ireland (sometimes known as Richard FitzGilbert), was an Anglo-Norman nobleman notable for his leading role in the Anglo-Norman invasion of Ireland. Like his father, Richard is commonly known by his nickname, Strongbow (Anglo-Norman: Arc-Fort). (Note: This may be a mistranscription or mistranslation of "Striguil", see Nickname section.)

After his son and heir, Gilbert, died childless before 1189, the earldom passed through Richard's daughter Isabel de Clare and to her husband, William Marshal.

== Nickname ==
During the Middle Ages, official documents, with few exceptions, were written in Latin; in the Domesday Exchequer annals, written between 1300 and 1304 (that means, over 120 years after Richard's death), he was referred to as "Ricardus cognomento Stranghose Comes Strugulliae", which translates to "Richard, known as Stranghose, earl of Striguil" (modern Chepstow).

In reality, Stranghose is probably a different spelling of Striguil. In the 14th century, the nickname was finally rendered as "Strongbow".

== Early life ==
Richard de Clare was the son of Gilbert de Clare, the first Earl of Pembroke and his wife, Isabel de Beaumont, daughter of Robert de Beaumont, Earl of Leicester and mistress of King Henry I. Richard also had a sister, Basilea de Clare.

Gilbert died in about 1148, and Richard inherited his father’s possessions when he was roughly 18 years old. In 1154, Henry II deprived Richard of the title for siding against his mother, Empress Matilda, during the Anarchy, and his contemporaries referred to him as Earl of Striguil for his marcher Lordship of Striguil, where he had a castle.

== Career ==
=== Background ===
Leinster (Laighin) among the other kingdoms of Gaelic Ireland

In 1167, Dermot MacMurrough was deposed as King of Leinster by Rory O'Connor, the High King of Ireland. To recover his kingdom, Dermot went to Aquitaine to ask Henry II of England for assistance, but Henry limited his help to permitting the recruitment of English mercenaries. Dermot failed to recruit in Wales but did meet Richard De Clare and the other lords of the Welsh Marches.

Dermot came to an agreement with Richard: If the latter helped the deposed king in the retaking of Leinster, he could have Aoife, Dermot's eldest daughter, in marriage, along with the succession to the crown if it was regained. Since Henry II's letter to Dermot was general in nature, Richard wanted to obtain the king's specific consent to travel to Ireland. In 1168, he raised the issue at court and was granted permission.

=== Campaign in Ireland ===
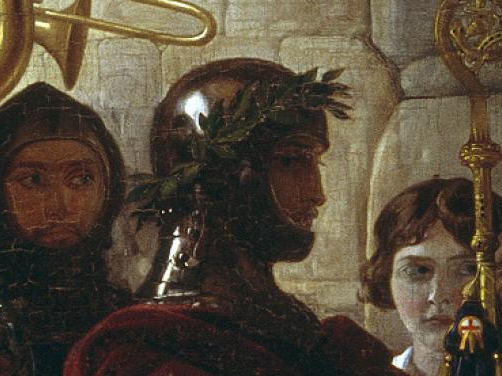
Detail of Strongbow from Daniel Maclise's painting below

Dermot and Richard raised a large army, commanded by Raymond FitzGerald, which included Welsh archers. The army sailed in Ireland and took the Ostman towns of Wexford, Waterford and Dublin (Note: These were longphorts where the Viking raiders settled, marrying Gaelic women and slightly acculturating to Gaelic customs (such as naming practices, MacGiollamhuire, MacTurkill, etc.), Dublin being the most famous. See: James F. Lydon, The Making of Ireland: From Ancient Times to Present (London; New York: Routledge, 1998), p. 21.) between 1169 and 1170. On 23 August 1170, Richard embarked on his ships at Milford Haven to join the force; however, a royal messenger arrived to forbid him to go. Richard sailed anyway and ignored the king's wishes.

Dermot died in May 1171, and his son Donal MacMurrough claimed the kingdom of Leinster in accordance to the Brehon laws. Richard, in turn, claimed the kingship in the right of his wife. At the same time, he sent his uncle, Hervey de Montmorency, on an embassy to Henry II to appease the king, who was growing worried with Richard's increasing power. Henry offered to return Richard's lands in France, England and Wales (which he had confiscated) in exchange for the conquered possessions in Ireland. Richard accepted and surrendered Dublin, Waterford and other fortresses to the English king, only keeping Kildare.

Henry crossed over to Ireland in October 1172 and stayed there for six months, stationing his own men where needed. His rule in Ireland was accepted by both the Gaelic and the Norman lords, and the relationship between him and Richard was restored. Richard, in fact, also agreed to help Henry with the revolt in France in 1173, and, as a reward, he was given his possession of Leinster back. In 1174, he tried to advance into Munster but was defeated in the battle of Thurles.

== Death and succession ==
Richard de Clare died in June 1176 of an infection in either his leg or foot. He was buried in Holy Trinity Church, Dublin, together with his uncle-in-law, Laurence O'Toole, Archbishop of Dublin. King Henry II took Richard's possessions for himself and placed a royal official in charge of them, protecting the inheritance of Richard's children. Richard's wife Aoife was given her dower rights and possibly held Striguil until the Welsh rebellion of 1184/85.

Richard was first succeeded by his son Gilbert (born 1173 – died c.1185/1189), making him the 3rd Earl of Pembroke. When Gilbert died, still a minor, the inheritance passed onto Richard's daughter Isabel. Isabel, on the wishes of Henry II and his son Richard the Lionheart, was given in spouse to William Marshal, who became the Earl of Pembroke for jure uxoris.

== Marriage and issue ==
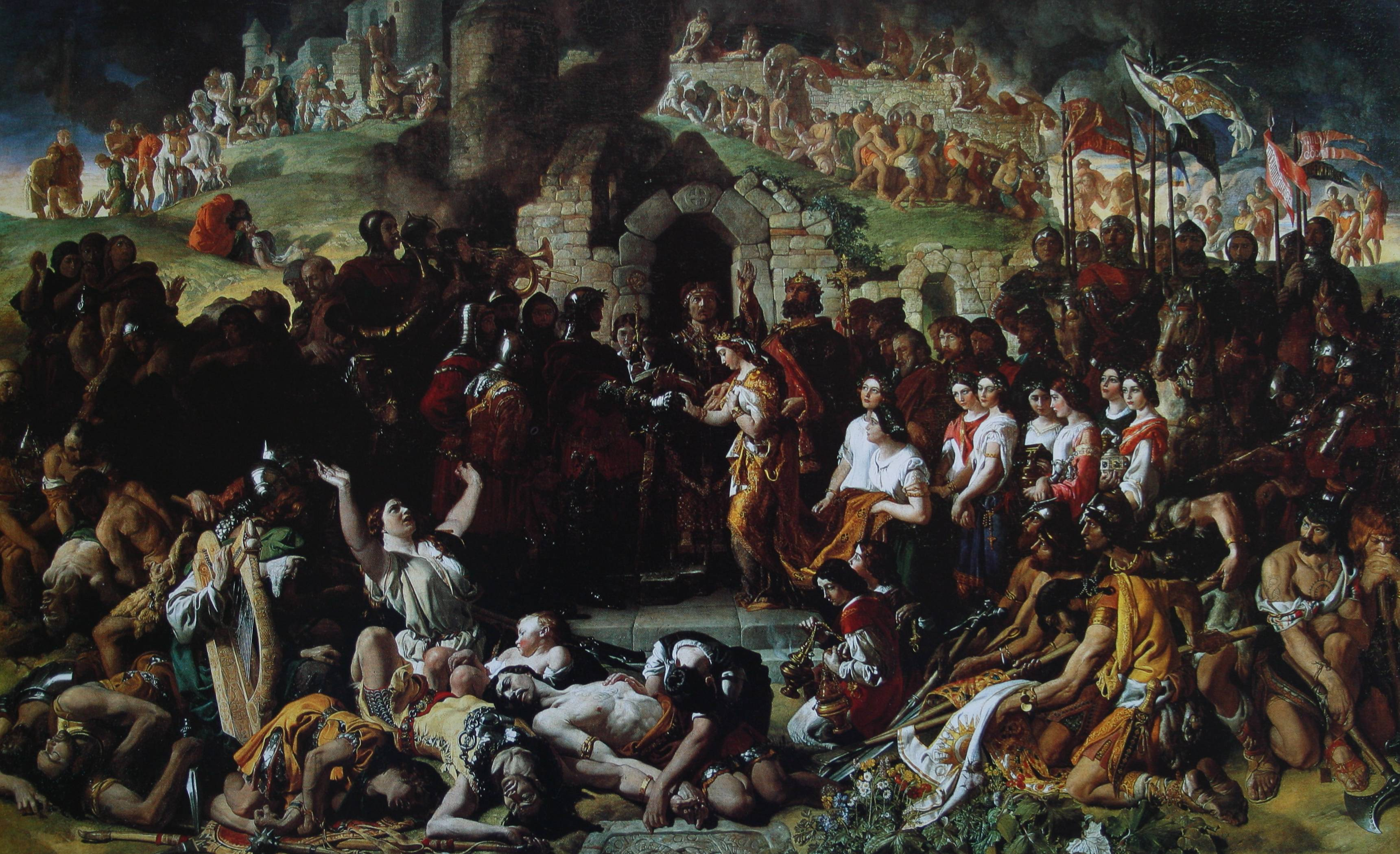
The Marriage of Strongbow and Aoife (1854) by Daniel Maclise, a romanticised depiction of the union in the ruins of Waterford

By an unknown mistress, Richard de Clare fathered two daughters:

- Aline de Clare, (Note: Aline was born well before her father married Aoife, daughter of Dermot. That both she and her unnamed sister were illegitimate is indicated by the fact that neither inherited anything from their father's great holdings. See: Cokayne, CP, X, Appendix H, 103) married William FitzMaurice FitzGerald, baron of Naas
- Basilia de Clare, married Robert de Quincy, Constable of Leinster.

On about 26 August 1171, in Reginald's Tower (Waterford), Richard de Clare married Aoife MacMurrough. Their children were:

- Gilbert de Clare, 3rd Earl of Pembroke, who died a minor in 1185
- Isabel de Clare, 4th Countess of Pembroke, who became Countess of Pembroke in her own right in 1185 (on the death of her brother) until her own death in 1220.

== Legacy ==
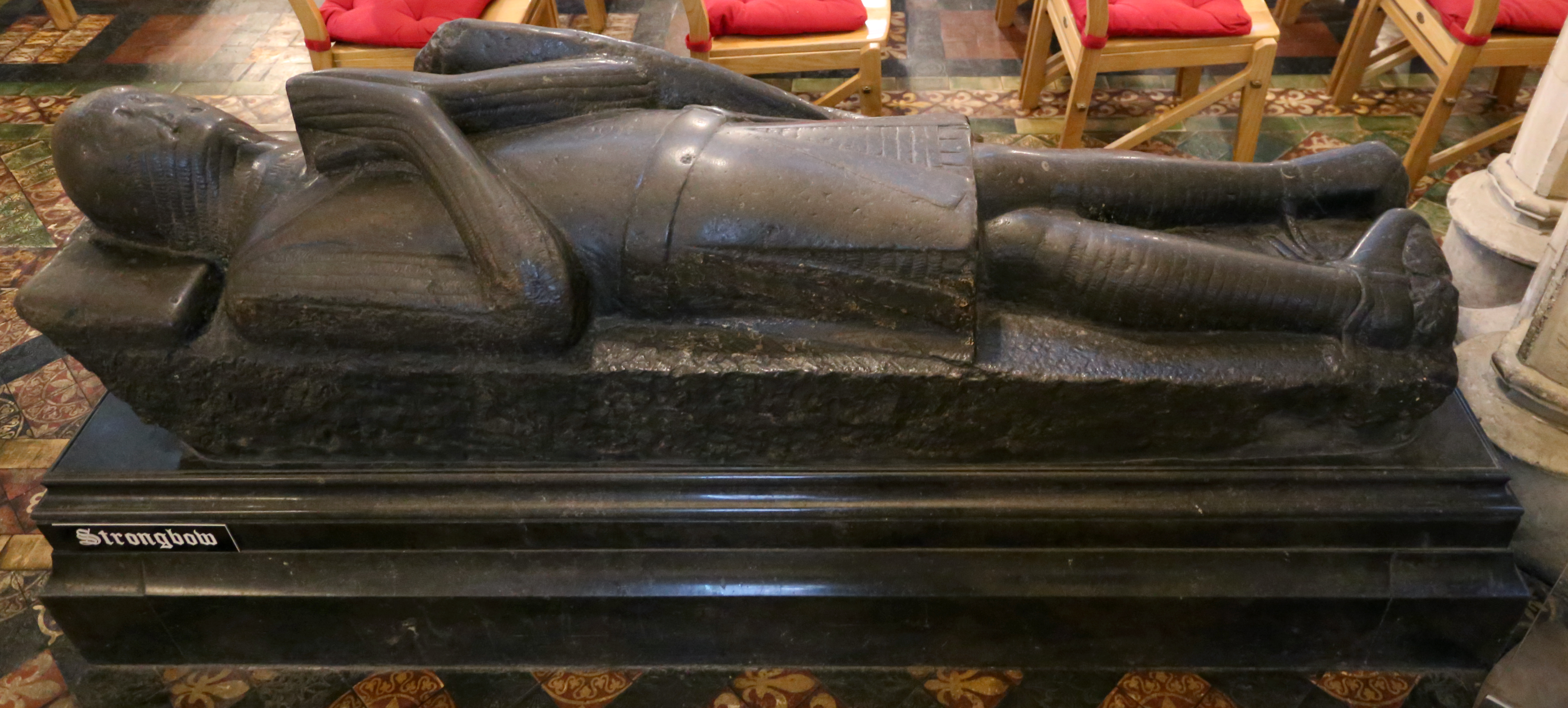
Strongbow's tomb, Christ Church Cathedral, Dublin

Richard de Clare was first interred in Dublin's Christ Church Cathedral, where a purported tomb effigy is located. Next to it lies a "smaller half-sized monument" which Richard Stanyhurst claimed was "that of Strongbow’s son, whom his father had cleft in twain for cowardice in battle", although "no contemporary authors" mention any such tale. Richard de Clare's actual tomb effigy was destroyed when the roof of the Cathedral collapsed in 1562. The effigy was replaced by "Strongbow’s distant successor, Lord Deputy Sir Henry Sidney", in 1570. "The larger figure dates from c. 1330, while the smaller [...] is probably late thirteenth- or early fourteenth-century. [...] What is clear is that the present tomb replaced the original. The tomb’s shield is not that of the de Clare family and today remains unidentified". Marc Marie, Marquis de Bombelles "described Strongbow’s tomb astutely as ‘the least authentic and the most remarkable’."

Richard de Clare was buried in Christ Church Cathedral, Dublin, within sight of the cross according to an eyewitness, Giraldus Cambrensis. There is little evidence to support the tradition that he was buried either in St Edan's Cathedral, Ferns, Christ Church Cathedral, Waterford or Dominican priory, Kilkenny. References to "de Clare" being buried in Gloucester Cathedral refer to his father, while those to "Strongbow" in Tintern abbey refer probably to Walter or Anselm Marshall, both of whom died in 1245.

== In popular culture ==
The English cider brand Strongbow is named after him.

== See also ==
- William Bendings
- The Song of Dermot and the Earl
- Normans in Ireland

== Notes ==
Political offices
New office	Justiciar of Ireland; 1173–1176	Unknown
Peerage of England
Preceded by Gilbert de Clare	Earl of Pembroke; 1148–1168	Succeeded by Gilbert de Clare
