= Cadwgan of Llandyfai =

Welsh cleric

Cadwgan also known as Cadwgan of Llandyfái or Martin (died 11 April 1241) was a Welsh cleric who was Bishop of Bangor from 1215 to 1236.

According to Giraldus Cambrensis, Cadwgan was the son of an Irish priest and a Welsh mother. The annals state that he was the son of a priest famous for the eloquence of his Welsh preaching. He was Abbot of the Cistercian Abbey of Whitland. Cadwgan is sometimes referred to as Martin, which may have been his monastic name. He was consecrated as Bishop of Bangor by the Archbishop of Canterbury on 21 June 1215 at Staines. Cadwgan probably owed his election to Llywelyn the Great, who was determined to have a Welsh rather than a Norman or English bishop and was by now powerful enough to get his way.

In 1234 he brought a shipload of corn from Ireland to feed the poor of his diocese. He entered the Cistercian abbey of Dore in Herefordshire in 1236 to live there as a monk, and died there on 11 April 1241. He wrote a theological work entitled De modo confitendi.
