= Isabella de Braose =

- Princess of Wales
- Born: c. 1222
- Died: c. 1248
- Spouse: Dafydd ap Llywelyn
- House: Braose
- Father: William de Braose
- Mother: Eva Marshal

Isabella, Princess of Wales and Lady of Snowdon (c. 1222 – c. 1248) was the eldest daughter of William de Braose, Lord of Abergavenny, and his wife Eva Marshal (daughter of William Marshal, 1st Earl of Pembroke). Isabella was married to Dafydd II, Prince of Wales, though their marriage proved childless.

== Marriage ==
William de Braose, Lord of Abergavenny, one of the most powerful barons in the Welsh Marches, had been captured in battle by Llywelyn, Prince of Gwynedd, in 1228. William had to agree to three important principles before Llywelyn would release him. Firstly, William was to pay a ransom of £2,000, "a sum corresponding so precisely to that which Llywelyn had to pay the king that it is reasonable to conjecture that the prince meant the one liability to discharge the other," according to J. E. Lloyd. William de Braose then had to agree never to take up arms against Llywelyn ever again. Lastly, William had to agree to arrange the marriage between his eldest daughter and co-heiress Isabella, with the lordship and castle of Builth as her marriage dowry, to Dafydd, Llywelyn's heir. With these terms agreed to, William was released in 1229.

The alliance by marriage between the Welsh principality and the vast Braose holdings in mid and south Wales would solidify the principality's southern borders. "The two magnates seemed to be about to enter into a close alliance when the tie was suddenly snapped by Llywelyn's discovery of an intrigue, no doubt set on foot during the period of captivity, between William and [Llywelyn's] wife," wrote Lloyd. During a friendly visit paid by William de Braose to Llywelyn at his court at Aber at Eastertide, Llywelyn happened upon his wife Joan with William de Braose, "in the dead of night". Discovering the affair, Llywelyn had Joan and William both separately imprisoned. As the scandal reached all across Wales and the March of William’s capture "the enemies of his house hastened from every quarter to see this scone of a hated stock brought to his account," wrote Lloyd, "even had Llywelyn been in the mood to resist the tide of popular passion, he might have found it hard to withstand the demand that William should die."

On 2nd of May, at a certain manor called ‘Crokein, he was made ‘Crogyn, i.e. hanged on a tree, and this not privily or in the night time, but openly and in the broad daylight, in the presence of more than 800 men assembled to behold the piteous and melancholy spectacle.

— Abbot of Vaundey as quoted by J. E. Lloyd., History of Wales from the Norman Invasion to the Edwardian Conquest, page 213.

However, Llywelyn did not wish to jeopardize an otherwise shrewd political marriage, and wrote to William's widow Eva and her brother William Marshal, 2nd Earl of Pembroke, who was now guardian to Isabella and her sisters the Braose co-heiresses, of his wish for the marriage to continue. Isabella was married to Dafydd, the future Prince of Wales, in 1230.

== Later life ==
Dafydd became ruler of Gwynedd and the prominent Welsh leader following Llywelyn's death in 1240, and was recognised as Prince of Wales by his uncle, King Henry III of England. Isabella's marriage with Dafydd proved childless. Her dowry of the lordship and castle of Builth was contested by the English crown, and with the 1247 Treaty of Woodstock it was transferred to the crown. However, as heiress of her mother Isabella did inherit the castle of Haverfordwest, lands in Caerleon and in Glamorgan. Additionally, she inherited livestock and other property in Welsh law as widow of Prince Dafydd. The cattle were transferred to the land of the Earl of Gloucester in August 1246.

== Historical novels ==
Princess Isabella appears as a minor character in several historical novels:

- Raymond Foxall (1959) Song for a Prince: The Story of Llywelyn the Great covers the period from King John's invasion in 1211 to the execution of William de Braose.
- Sharon Kay Penman (1985) Here be Dragons Isabella appears as a minor character wed to Dafydd, Prince of Wales.
- Edith Pargeter (1960–63) "The Heaven Tree Trilogy" features Llywelyn, Joan, William de Braose, and several of Llywelyn's sons as major characters, amongst them Dafydd with Isabella appearing as his wife.
