= Dafydd ap Llywelyn =

Prince of Gwynedd from 1240 to 1246

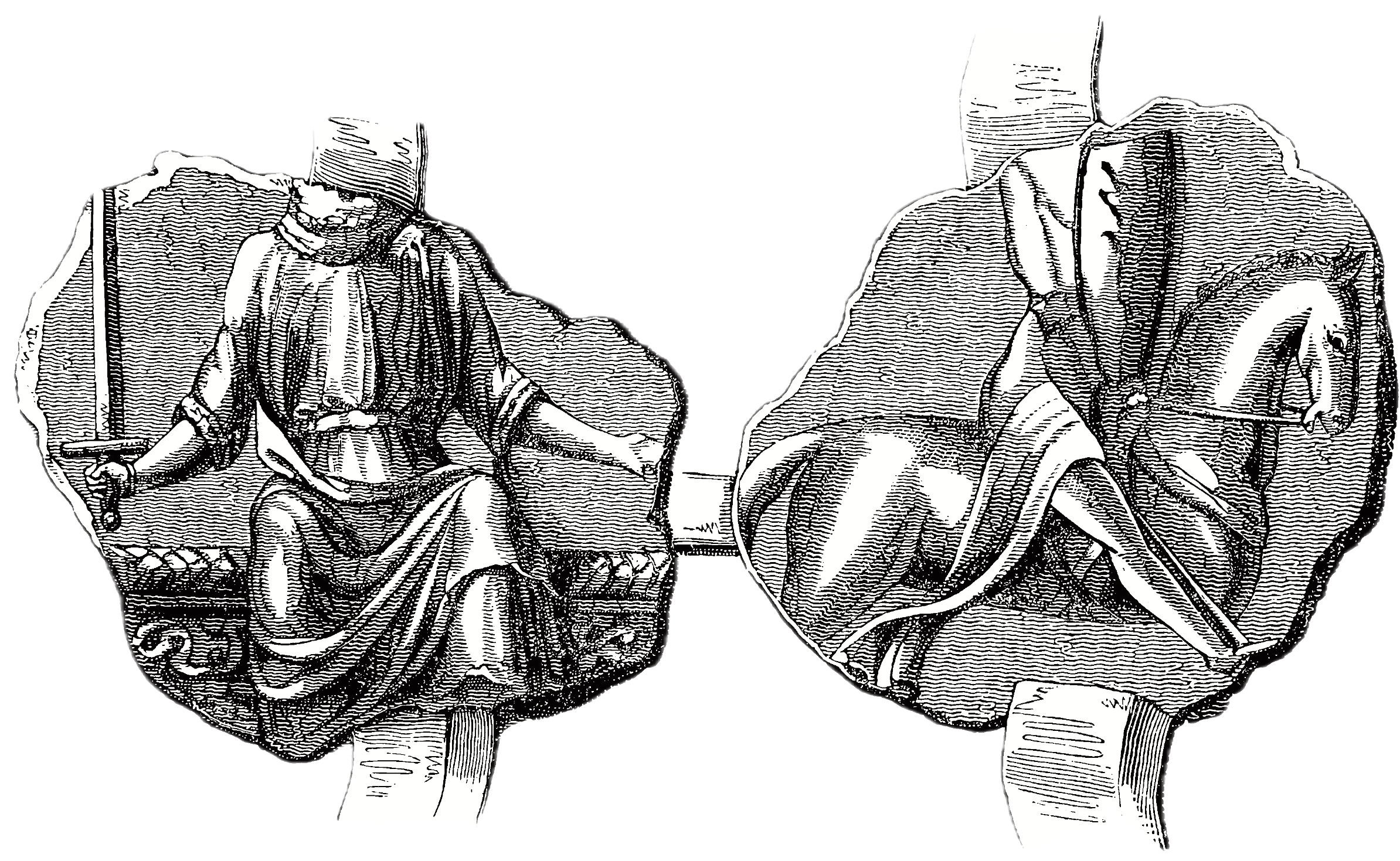
- An engraving of Dafydd ap Llywelyn's seal

Prince of Gwynedd
- Reign: 11 April 1240 – 25 February 1246
- Predecessor: Llywelyn ab Iorwerth
- Successor: After the Treaty of Woodstock: Owain Goch ap Gruffudd (in Aberffraw, Rhosyr, Llŷn, and Dunoding); Llywelyn ap Gruffudd (in Cemais, Arfon, Arllechwedd, and Penllyn); Dafydd ap Gruffudd (in Cymydmaen)
- Contender: Grufudd ap Llywelyn (11 April 1240 – 1 March 1244)

Prince of Wales
- Pretence: c. 1244 – 25 February 1246
- Predecessor: Rhys ap Gruffudd
- Successor: Llywelyn ap Gruffudd
- Distain: Ednyfed Fychan (11 April 1240 – 25 February 1246)
- Born: April 1212; Castell Hen Blas, Bagillt, Tegeingl, Wales
- Died: 25 February 1246 (aged 33); Abergwyngregyn, Arllechwedd, Wales
- Burial: Aberconwy Abbey, Arllechwedd, Wales
- Spouse: Isabella de Braose (m. 1229)
- Issue: Annes (ill.); Llywelyn (ill.); Dafydd (spurious)
- House: Second Dynasty of Gwynedd
- Father: Llywelyn ab Iorwerth
- Mother: Joan, Lady of Wales

Dafydd ap Llywelyn (c. April 1212 – 25 February 1246) was Prince of Gwynedd from 1240 to 1246.

== Birth and descent ==
Though birth years of 1208, 1206, and 1215 have been put forward for Dafydd, it has recently been persuasively argued that he was born shortly after Easter 1212. Born at Castell Hen Blas, Coleshill, Bagillt in Flintshire, he was the only son of Llywelyn ab Iorwerth (Llywelyn the Great) by his wife Joan, Lady of Wales (daughter of King John). His grandfather was facing trouble in England against his Barons when he was born. In his final years, Llywelyn went to great lengths to have Dafydd accepted as his sole heir. By Welsh law, Dafydd's older half-brother Gruffydd had a claim to be Llywelyn's successor. Llywelyn had Dafydd recognised as his named heir by his uncle King Henry III in 1220 and also had Dafydd's mother Joan declared legitimate by the Pope Honorius III to strengthen Dafydd's claim.

== Conflict ==
There was considerable support for Gruffydd in Gwynedd. Although Dafydd lost one of his most important supporters when his mother died in 1237, he retained the support of Ednyfed Fychan, the Seneschal of Gwynedd who wielded great political influence. Llywelyn suffered a paralytic stroke in 1237, and Dafydd took an increasing role in government. Dafydd ruled Gwynedd following his father's death in 1240.

Although Henry III had accepted his claim to rule Gwynedd, he was not disposed to allow him to retain his father's conquests outside Gwynedd. As the diplomatic situation deteriorated, Dafydd began to explore alliances with others against Henry and is known to have sent ambassadors to the court of Louis IX of France. In August 1241, however, King Henry III invaded Gwynedd, and after a short campaign, Dafydd was forced to submit. Under the terms of the Treaty of Gwerneigron, he had to give up all his lands outside Gwynedd and also to hand over to the King his half-brother Gruffydd, whom he had imprisoned. Henry thereby gained what could have been a useful weapon against Dafydd, with the possibility of setting Gruffydd up as a rival to Dafydd in Gwynedd, but in March 1244 Gruffydd fell to his death while trying to escape from the Tower of London by climbing down a knotted sheet.

== Later reign and death ==
This freed Dafydd's hands, and he entered into an alliance with other Welsh princes to attack English possessions in Wales. He enjoyed several successes in the north: by March 1245 he had recovered the castle of Mold along with his former possessions in modern-day Flintshire, and it is possible that the castle of Dyserth also fell to his men in the summer. In August 1245 King Henry again invaded Gwynedd. Henry proceeded as far as the river Conwy and began building a new castle at Deganwy.

Dafydd also began diplomacy with Pope Innocent IV, the result of which was a recognition by Rome of his right to rule over North Wales. After a flurry of diplomatic activity by Henry, the decision was reversed in 1245. Savage fighting continued at Deganwy until Henry, some of whose supplies had been captured by the Welsh, ran short of provisions. A truce was agreed and Henry's army withdrew in the autumn. The truce remained in effect throughout the winter, but the war was effectively ended by the sudden death of Dafydd in the royal home at Abergwyngregyn, in February 1246. He was buried with his father at Aberconwy Abbey. The writer of Brut y Tywysogyon described him as tarian Cymru – the shield of Wales. The poet Dafydd Benfras composed an elegy in his honour.

== Succession ==
Since Dafydd's marriage to Isabella de Braose, daughter of William de Braose, had failed to produce an heir (though some early modern genealogists record him as having sired sons, including Dafydd) the two elder sons of Gruffydd, Llywelyn ap Gruffudd and Owain Goch ap Gruffydd, divided Gwynedd between them and continued the war with King Henry until April 1247, when Llywelyn and Owain met the King at Woodstock and came to terms with him at the cost of the loss of much territory. The pair would continue to rule over Gwynedd jointly until Llywelyn's victory over Owain at the Battle of Bryn Derwin in 1255.

== Ancestry ==
Ancestors of Dafydd ap Llywelyn

16. Gruffudd ap Cynan
8. Owain Gwynedd
17. Angharad ferch Owain ab Edwin
4. Iorwerth Drwyndwn
18. Llywarch ap Trahaearn
9. Gwladus ferch Llywarch
19. Dyddgu ferch Iorwerth
2. Llywelyn ab Iorwerth
20. Maredudd ap Bleddyn
10. Madog ap Maredudd
21. Hunydd ferch Einudd
5. Margred ferch Madog
22. Gruffudd ap Cynan
11. Susanna ferch Gruffudd
23. Angharad ferch Owain ab Edwin
1. Dafydd ap Llywelyn
24. Geoffrey Plantagenet, Count of Anjou
12. Henry II of England
25. Empress Matilda
6. John, King of England
26. William X, Duke of Aquitaine
13. Eleanor, Duchess of Aquitaine
27. Aénor de Châtellerault
3. Joan, Lady of Wales (ill.)
7. Clemence

== Arms ==
Coats of Arms of Dafydd ap Llywelyn
Arms	Details
	Arms of Dafydd, as attested in Matthew Paris' Chronica maiora (Cambridge Corpus Christi College MS 16), recording the death of Dafydd on February 25, 1246: Quarterly Or and Gules, four lions passant counter-changed.
	Another set of arms attributed to Dafydd by Matthew: Or, three roundels Vert, on a chief dancetty Vert a lion passant Sable.

== Sources ==
- Bartrum, P. C., ed. (1976). Welsh Genealogies: AD 300-1400. Cardiff: University of Wales Press. doi:10.20391/40837b6f-1887-4afd-9c6e-9b7e3a122693. ISBN 070830561X. Archived from the original on 6 June 2023.
- Cussans, Thomas; The Times Kings and Queens of The British Isles, ISBN 0-00-714195-5.
- Edwards, J. G. (ed.); Calendar of Ancient Correspondence concerning Wales, (Cardiff, 1935).
- Siddons, Michael Powell (1991). The Development of Welsh Heraldry. Vol. 1. Aberystwyth: National Library of Wales. ISBN 090715851X.
- —— (1993). The Development of Welsh Heraldry. Vol. 2. Aberystwyth: National Library of Wales. ISBN 090715851X.
- Pryce, Huw, ed. (2005). The Acts of Welsh Rulers, 1120–1283. Cardiff: University of Wales Press. ISBN 9780708318973. IA actsofwelshruler0000unse.
- Stephenson, David and Craig Owen Jones; "The date and the context of the birth of Dafydd ap Llywelyn", Flintshire Historical Society Journal, 39 (2012).
- "Hen Blas;Coleshill Castle (307131)", Coflein, RCAHMW

Dafydd ap Llywelyn Second Dynasty of Gwynedd Born: April 1212 Died: 25 February 1246
Regnal titles
Preceded by Llywelyn ab Iorwerth	King of Gwynedd; 1240–1246	Succeeded by Llywelyn ap Gruffudd and Owain Goch ap Gruffudd
