= Joan, Lady of Wales =

Princess of Gwynedd from 1205 to 1237

Joan
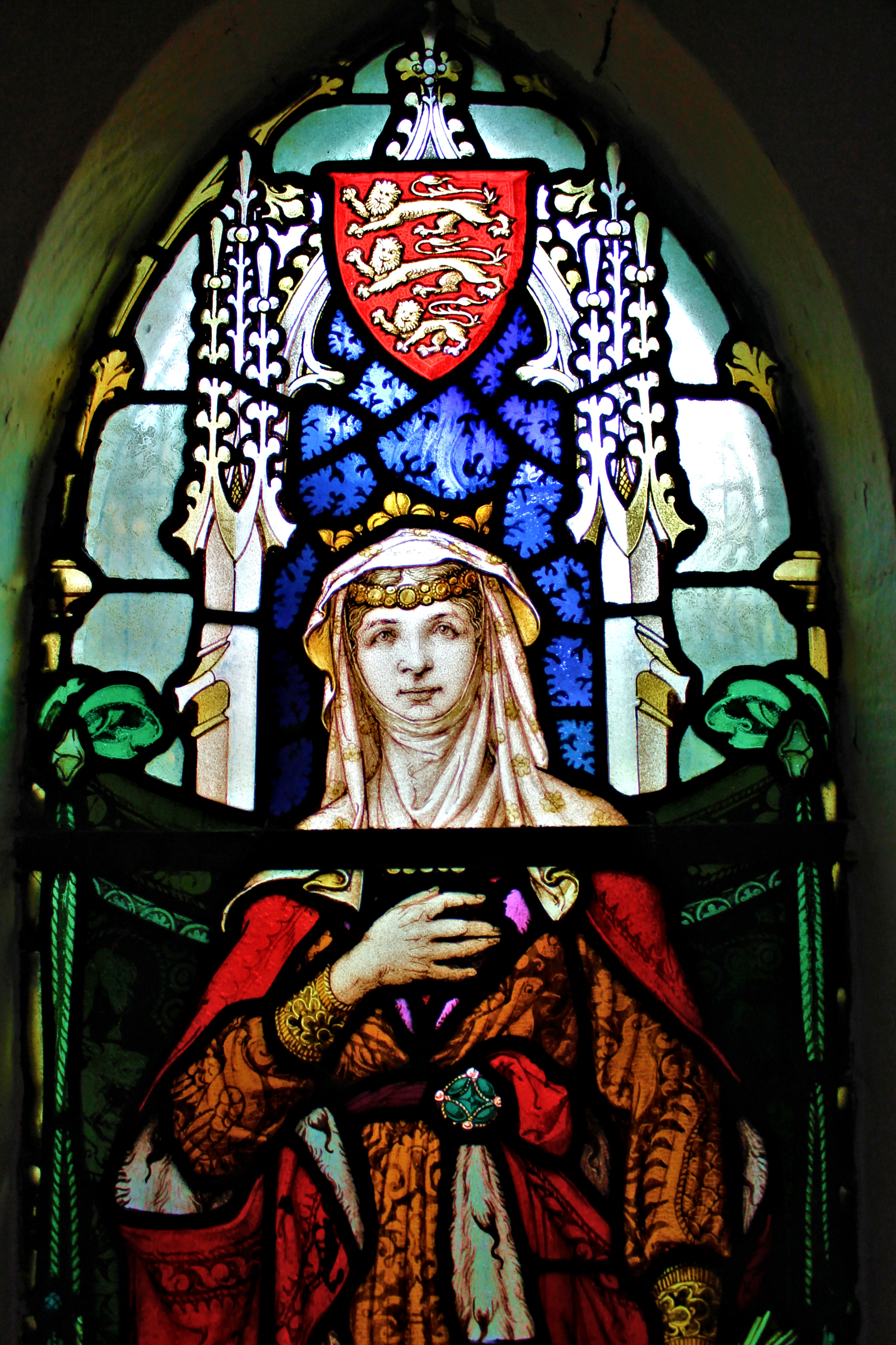
- Modern stained glass depiction of Joan, St Mary's, Trefriw, from 1933

Princess consort of Gwynedd
- Reign: 1205 – 2 February 1237
- Born: c. 1191
- Died: 2 February 1237 (aged 45–46)
- Spouse: Llywelyn ab Iorwerth (m. 1205)
- Issue Detail: Gwladus ferch Llywelyn; Dafydd ap Llywelyn; Elen ferch Llywelyn; Susanna ferch Llywelyn; Marared ferch Llywelyn
- House: Plantagenet
- Father: John, King of England
- Mother: Clemence

Joan, Lady of Wales (Welsh: Siwan, Welsh pronunciation: [ʃɪʊan], c. 1191/92 – 2 February 1237) was an illegitimate daughter of John, King of England, and the wife of Llywelyn the Great.

== Early life ==
Joan should not be confused with her half-sister, Joan, Queen of Scotland.

Little is known about her early life. Her mother's name is known only from Joan's obituary in the Tewkesbury Annals, where she is called "Regina Clementina" (Queen Clemence); there is no evidence that her mother was in fact of royal blood. Joan may have been born in France, and probably spent part of her childhood there, as King John had her brought to England from Normandy in December 1203, in preparation for a marriage alliance to Llywelyn ab Iorwerth, Prince of Gwynedd.

== Marriage ==
Joan was betrothed to Llywelyn the Great in 1204, and the marriage is thought to have taken place in 1205, although some of the annals of the abbey of St Werburgh in Chester say that it occurred in 1204. She and Llywelyn had at least four children together:

- Gwladus Ddu (1206–1251), who married (1) Reginald de Braose and (2) Ralph de Mortimer, with whom she had issue.
- Elen ferch Llywelyn (Helen or Ellen) (1207–1253), married (1) John the Scot, Earl of Chester and (2) Robert II de Quincy
- Susanna, who was sent to England as a hostage in 1228, and possibly married Máel Coluim II, Earl of Fife in 1230.
- Dafydd ap Llywelyn (c. 1212–1246) married Isabella de Braose, died at Abergwyngregyn.

Some of Llywelyn's other recorded children may also have been Joan's:

- Angharad ferch Llywelyn
- Marared/Margaret (born c. 1202) who married (1) Sir John de Braose (called Tadody), grandson of William de Braose, 4th Lord of Bramber. She married (2) Sir Walter de Clifford and had children by both husbands.

Joan often mediated between her husband and her father. According to Brut y Tywysogion (The Chronicle of the Princes), when John was successfully campaigning in North Wales, "Llywelyn, being unable to suffer the king's rage, sent his wife, the king's daughter, to him, by the counsel of his leading men, to seek to make peace with the king on whatever terms he could."

In April 1226 Joan obtained a papal decree from Pope Honorius III, declaring her legitimate on the basis that her parents had not been married to others at the time of her birth, but without giving her a claim to the English throne.

Joan has been referred to as both "Lady of Wales" and "Princess of Wales".

=== Adultery ===
At Easter 1230, William de Braose, who was Llywelyn's prisoner at the time, was discovered with Joan in Llywelyn's bedchamber. William de Braose was hanged on 2 May 1230, according to local folklore at Abergwyngregyn; the place was known as Gwern y Grog. A letter from Nicholas, Abbot of Vaudy, suggests that the execution took place at Crogen near Bala (crogi means to hang).

Joan was placed under house arrest for twelve months after the incident. She was then, according to the Chronicle of Chester, forgiven by Llywelyn and restored to favour. She may have given birth to a daughter early in 1231.

== Death and burial ==
Joan died at the royal home at Abergwyngregyn, on the north coast of Gwynedd, in 1237. Llywelyn's great grief at her death is recorded; he founded a Franciscan friary in her honour on the seashore at Llanfaes, opposite the royal residence. This was consecrated in 1240, shortly before Llywelyn died. It was destroyed in 1537 by Henry VIII of England during the dissolution of the monasteries. A stone coffin originally identified as Joan's can be seen in St Mary's and St Nicholas's parish church, Beaumaris, Anglesey. Above the empty coffin is a slate panel inscribed:

"This plain sarcophagus, (once dignified as having contained the remains of Joan, daughter of King John, and consort of Llewelyn ap Iorwerth, Prince of North Wales, who died in the year 1237), having been conveyed from the Friary of Llanfaes, and alas, used for many years as a horsewatering trough, was rescued from such an indignity and placed here for preservation as well as to excite serious meditation on the transitory nature of all sublunary distinctions. By Thomas James Warren Bulkeley, Viscount Bulkeley, Oct 1808"

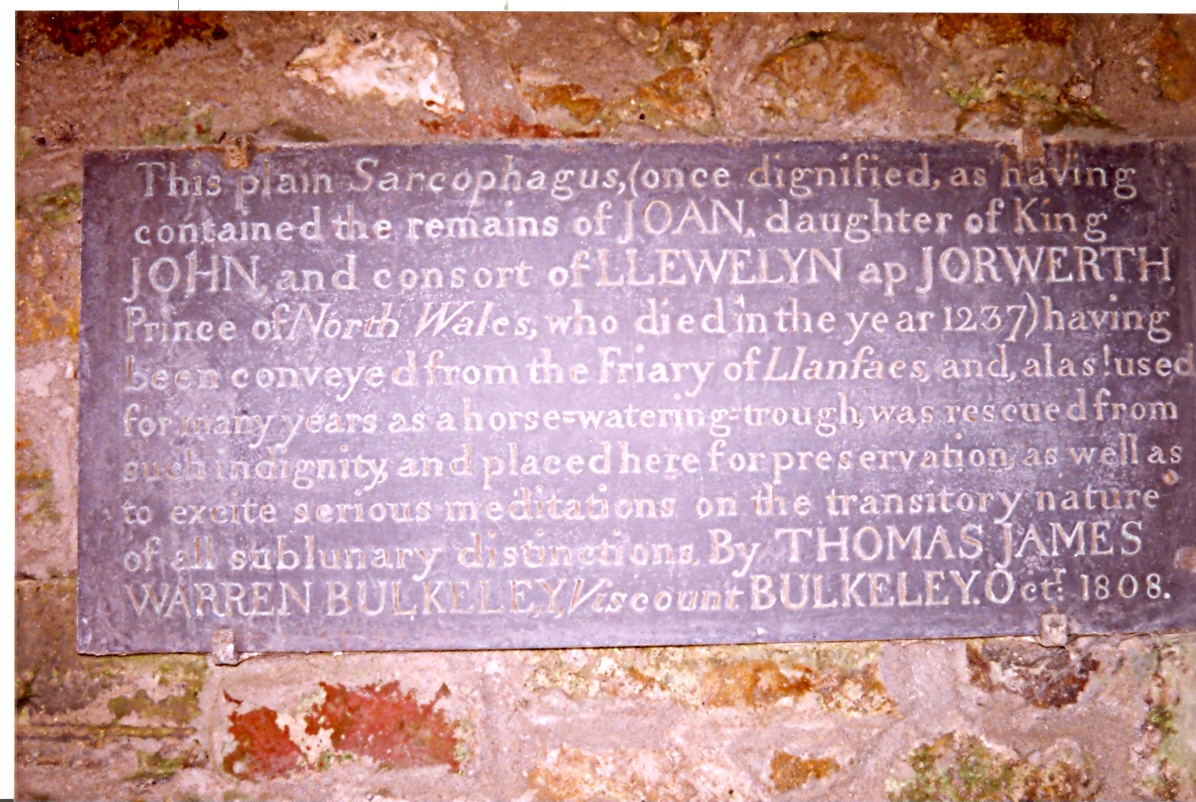
The slate panel at Beaumaris

In recent years doubt has been cast on the identity of the woman shown on the coffin lid, which is not thought to belong to the coffin on which it rests. Experts have suggested the costume and style of carving belong to a much later decade than the 1230s when Joan died, although the coronet would indicate a member of the royal family. Eleanor de Montfort is thought the likeliest alternative.

== In literature ==
- Joan and her affair with William de Braose is the subject of Saunders Lewis's Welsh-language verse play Siwan.
- Edith Pargeter's novel The Green Branch is set in Wales and the Welsh Marches in 1228–1231, when Llewelyn ruled Gwynedd and most of the rest of Wales.
- Joan is the main character of Sharon Kay Penman's novel Here Be Dragons, which uses the alternative spelling "Joanna".

== Sources ==
- Lee, Sidney, ed. (1892). "Joan (d.1237)" . Dictionary of National Biography. Vol. 29. London: Smith, Elder & Co.
- Rotuli Litterarum Clausarum in Turri Londinensi I, p. 12.
- Henry Luard. Annales Monastici 1, 1864
- Tewkesbury Annals
- Ancestral Roots of Certain American Colonists Who Came to America Before 1700; by Frederick Lewis Weis, Lines: 27–27, 29A–28, 29A–29, 176B–27, 254–28, 254–29
