= Cross Ash =

Coordinates: 51.872994°N 2.863312°W

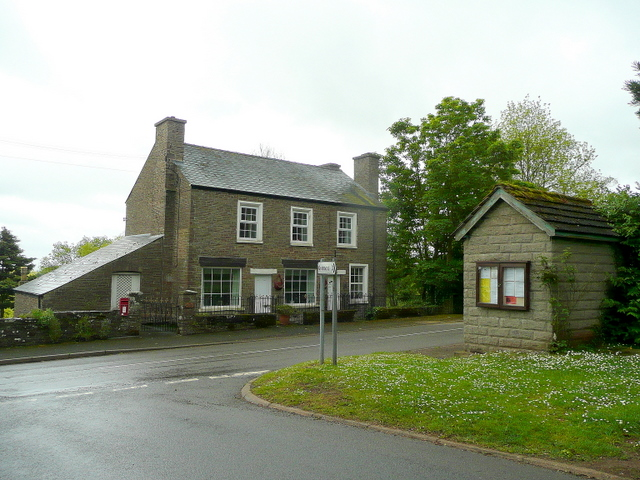
- Old Post Office in Cross Ash

- Location within Monmouthshire
- OS grid reference: SO407197
- Principal area: Monmouthshire
- Preserved county: Gwent
- Country: Wales
- Sovereign state: United Kingdom
- Post town: ABERGAVENNY
- Postcode district: NP7
- Dialling code: 01873
- Police: Gwent
- Fire: South Wales
- Ambulance: Welsh
- UK Parliament: Monmouth

Cross Ash is a village in Monmouthshire, south east Wales. It is located on the B4521 road between Abergavenny and Skenfrith, some six miles north east of Abergavenny. The Welsh name for Cross Ash is Croesonnen, although it is not currently in official use.

== Setting ==
Cross Ash is situated in a rural part of north-east Monmouthshire. The village is located on the southern foothills of Graig Syfyrddin, where several country lanes converge on the B4521 road. It is virtually equidistant between the 'three castles of Gwent', White Castle, Skenfrith Castle and Grosmont Castle.

== History and amenities ==
Cross Ash has a primary school which serves an expansive rural area. Next door to the school is a village hall which serves as the venue for the annual Cross Ash Show and Fun Day. There was formerly a post office and petrol station in the village however both are now closed.

== Welsh name ==
The Welsh name is recorded in the form Croesonen on Charles Bugden's 1813 map of the area, referring to what is now Cross Ash Farm. It contains the common Welsh words croes 'cross' and onnen 'ash tree' and, like Cross Ash, means 'the cross of the ash tree'.

In 2004 the name, in the form Croes Onnen, was added to the road signs for the village. This was opposed by campaigners who suggested it had no historical basis and who claimed there had been no consultation with local people. The Welsh name was removed from the local road signs in 2011.

Cross Ash Primary school uses 'Ysgol Gynradd Croes Onnen' as its Welsh name, as seen on signage erected in 2021.
