= 1254 =

1254 in various calendars
- Gregorian calendar: 1254; MCCLIV
- Ab urbe condita: 2007
- Armenian calendar: 703; ԹՎ ՉԳ
- Assyrian calendar: 6004
- Balinese saka calendar: 1175–1176
- Bengali calendar: 660–661
- Berber calendar: 2204
- English Regnal year: 38 Hen. 3 – 39 Hen. 3
- Buddhist calendar: 1798
- Burmese calendar: 616
- Byzantine calendar: 6762–6763
- Chinese calendar: 癸丑年 (Water Ox); 3951 or 3744 — to — 甲寅年 (Wood Tiger); 3952 or 3745
- Coptic calendar: 970–971
- Discordian calendar: 2420
- Ethiopian calendar: 1246–1247
- Hebrew calendar: 5014–5015
- Hindu calendars
- Vikram Samvat: 1310–1311
- Shaka Samvat: 1175–1176
- Kali Yuga: 4354–4355
- Holocene calendar: 11254
- Igbo calendar: 254–255
- Iranian calendar: 632–633
- Islamic calendar: 651–652
- Japanese calendar: Kenchō 6 (建長６年)
- Javanese calendar: 1163–1164
- Julian calendar: 1254; MCCLIV
- Korean calendar: 3587
- Minguo calendar: 658 before ROC 民前658年
- Nanakshahi calendar: −214
- Thai solar calendar: 1796–1797
- Tibetan calendar: ཆུ་མོ་གླང་ལོ་ (female Water-Ox); 1380 or 999 or 227 — to — ཤིང་ཕོ་སྟག་ལོ་ (male Wood-Tiger); 1381 or 1000 or 228

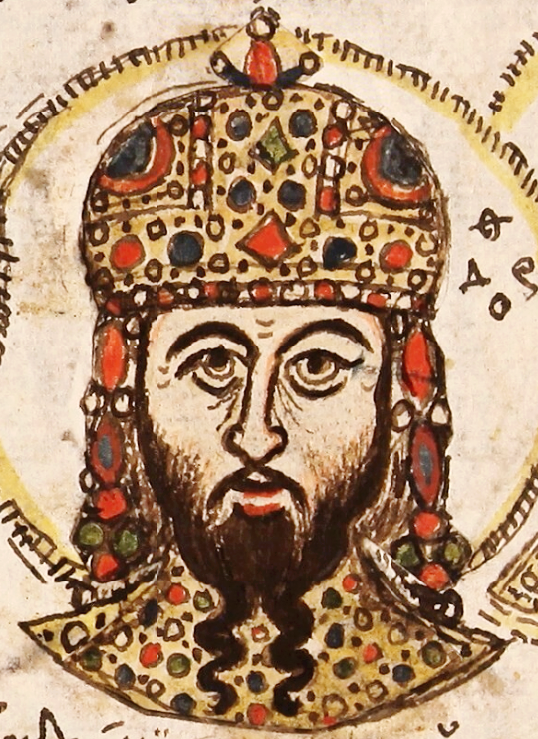
Theodore II Laskaris, Emperor of Nicaea, 1254–1258

Year 1254 (MCCLIV) was a common year starting on Thursday of the Julian calendar.

== Events ==
=== By place ===
==== Byzantine Empire ====
- Battle of Adrianople: Byzantine forces under Emperor Theodore II Laskaris defeat the invading Bulgarians near Edirne (Adrianople). The young and inexperienced Tsar Michael II Asen is caught by surprise and the Bulgarians suffer heavy losses. Michael is wounded during his hasty retreat through the forest.

==== Europe ====
- May 21 – King Conrad IV, son of the late Emperor Frederick II, dies of malaria at Lavello (southern Italy). With Conrad's death a interregnum begins, during which no ruler manages to gain undisputed control of Germany. The 22-year-old Manfred, half-brother of Conrad, refuses to surrender Sicily to Pope Innocent IV and accepts the regency on behalf of Conrad's 2-year-old son Conradin ("the Younger").
- November 2 – German forces under Manfred start an anti-papal revolt against Innocent IV and seize Lucera in the Tavoliere Plains. He defeats the papal army at Foggia and gains the loyalty of Apulia, on December 2.
- King Afonso III of Portugal ("the Boulonnais") holds the first session of the Cortes (Portugal's general assembly composed of nobles, members of the middle class and representatives from all municipalities), in Leiria.
- William II, anti-king of Germany, holds a diet (princely convention) at Worms, in which the German cities are represented for the first time. He gives orders to build strong castles in Heemskerk and Haarlem.
- Doge Reniero Zeno sends the Horses of Saint Mark, looted from Constantinople during the Fourth Crusade, to Venice, where they are installed on the terrace of the façade of St. Mark's Basilica.

==== England ====
- King Henry III of England grants his eldest son the Lord Edward areas of land including crown lands in Wales, Ireland, the Channel Islands and Gascony. He is also given the cities of Bristol, Stamford and Grantham. The reason for these concessions is to give Edward experience of governing lands of his own before becoming a king. Edward is granted the Three Castles in Wales, Skenfrith Castle, White Castle and Grosmont Castle.
- Summer – The Lord Edward travels from Portsmouth with his mother, Queen Eleanor of Provence, and Boniface of Savoy, archbishop of Canterbury, to marry the 13-year-old Eleanor of Castile, the half-sister of King Alfonso X of Castile. Henry III has demanded the marriage in exchange for ending the war with Alfonso. In August, the party arrives in Burgos, capital of Castile, where the marriage is due to take place.
- November 1 – Edward marries Eleanor of Castile in the Cistercian monastery of Las Huelgas at Burgos.

==== Levant ====
- February 21 – King Louis IX of France ("the Saint") signs a multi-year truce with An-Nasir Yusuf, Ayyubid ruler of Damascus, who is well aware of a Mongol threat and has no wish for war with the Crusader States.
- April 24 – Louis IX and his family sail from Acre to France. His boat is nearly wrecked off the coast of Cyprus and later nearly destroyed by fire. In July, the royal party arrives at Hyères in Provence.

==== Asia ====
- January 4 – William of Rubruck, Flemish missionary and explorer, is received courteously with an embassy at Karakorum. He is given an audience with Möngke Khan, who is loaded with gifts and letters from Louis IX.
- Kertanagara is appointed as king of Singhasari by his father.

=== By topic ===
==== Cities and Towns ====
- June 12 – The Dutch city of Alkmaar obtains city rights from William II, anti-king of Germany.
- The Danish city of Copenhagen receives its city charter from Bishop Jacob Erlandsen.

==== Commerce ====
- The Rhenish League, a confederation of trading cities, is established in the Rhineland, Western Germany. The league (or Städtebund) comprises 59 cities.

==== Literature ====
- The Japanese classic text Kokon Chomonjū is completed during the Kamakura Period under the reign of the 11-year-old Emperor Go-Fukakusa.

==== Markets ====
- As part of an offensive against usury in north-western Europe, Innocent IV relieves the city of Beauvais from its obligations to its creditors.

==== Religion ====
- March (possible date) – The existence and name of purgatory is acknowledged by the Catholic Church.
- December 7 – Innocent IV dies after a pontificate of 11 years. He is succeeded by Alexander IV as the 181st pope of the Catholic Church.
- The construction of the Cathedral of Saint Martin is initiated by Henry I van Vianden, bishop of Utrecht.

== Births ==
- March 27 – Hkun Law, Burmese ruler of Martaban (d. 1311)
- May 4 – Benvenuta Bojani, Italian nun and mystic (d. 1292)
- May 13 – Marie of Brabant, queen consort of France (d. 1322)
- June 24 – Floris V, count of Holland and Zeeland (d. 1296)
- September 15 – Marco Polo, Venetian explorer (d. 1324)
- 5 November or 6 December – Beatrice of Castile, marchioness of Montferrat (d. 1286)
- Bengt Birgersson, Swedish duke and bishop (d. 1291)
- Bonacossa Borri (or Bonaca), Italian noblewoman (d. 1321)
- Charles II of Naples ("the Lame"), son of Charles I of Anjou (d. 1309)
- Fujiwara no Tamekane, Japanese official and poet (d. 1332)
- Gerhard II, Count of Holstein-Plön ("the Blind"), German nobleman and knight (d. 1312)
- Nijō Morotada, Japanese nobleman and official (d. 1341)
- Osman I, founding ruler of the Ottoman Empire (d. 1324)
- Ren Renfa (or Ziming), Chinese artist and politician (d. 1327)
- Roger de Mowbray, English nobleman and knight (d. 1297)
- Tetsugyū Enshin, Japanese monk and scholar (d. 1326)
- Zhao Mengfu, Chinese scholar and calligrapher (d. 1322)

== Deaths ==
- March 28 – William de Ferrers, 5th Earl of Derby, English nobleman (b. 1193)
- May 21 – Conrad IV, king of Germany en Sicily (b. 1228)
- June 3 – Andrea Caccioli, Italian friar and priest (b. 1194)
- June 8 – Robert of Nantes, Latin patriarch of Jerusalem
- June 17 – Ingeborg Eriksdotter, Swedish princess (b. 1212)
- August 6 – Hugh of Northwold, English abbot and bishop
- September 25 – William III de Cantilupe, English nobleman
- November 3
  - John III Doukas Vatatzes, Byzantine emperor
  - Manuel II, Byzantine patriarch of Constantinople
- November 11 – Gil Torres, Spanish archdeacon and cardinal
- December 1 – Abel de Gullane (or Golynn), Scottish bishop
- December 7 – Innocent IV, pope of the Catholic Church
- December – Peter Chaceporc, English archdeacon and ambassador
- Berthold of Pietengau, German prince-bishop of Passau
- Faris al-Din Aktay, Egyptian nobleman and emir (prince)
- Rudolf von Ems, German knight, poet and writer (b. 1200)
- Silvester de Everdon, English bishop and Lord Chancellor
- Bab Bachir, spouse of last Abbasid caliph al-Musta'sim.
