= Graig Syfyrddin =

Hill in Wales

Coordinates: 51.88435°N 2.86878°W

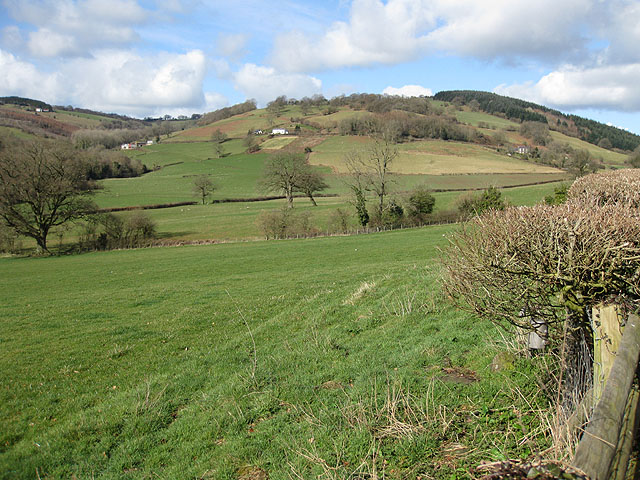
- Graig Syfyrddin viewed from the west

Highest point
- Elevation: 423 m (1,388 ft)
- Prominence: 235 m (771 ft)
- Parent peak: Ysgyryd Fawr
- Listing: Marilyn

Geography
- Location: Monmouthshire, Wales
- Parent range: Brecon Beacons
- OS grid: SO403210

Graig Syfyrddin or just The Graig, is a 423m high hill near Grosmont in north-eastern Monmouthshire, Wales. The summit knoll is known as Edmund's Tump. The hill consists of an isolated mass of the micaceous sandstones of the Brownstones Formation, a unit of the Old Red Sandstone well known from the nearby Black Mountains, of which it can be considered an outlier in both the geographical and geological sense.

The Three Castles Walk, a waymarked recreational walk in Monmouthshire linking Grosmont Castle, White Castle (Wales) and Skenfrith Castle passes over the hill.
