= Croft Farm Barn, Llantilio Crossenny =

Croft Farm Barn
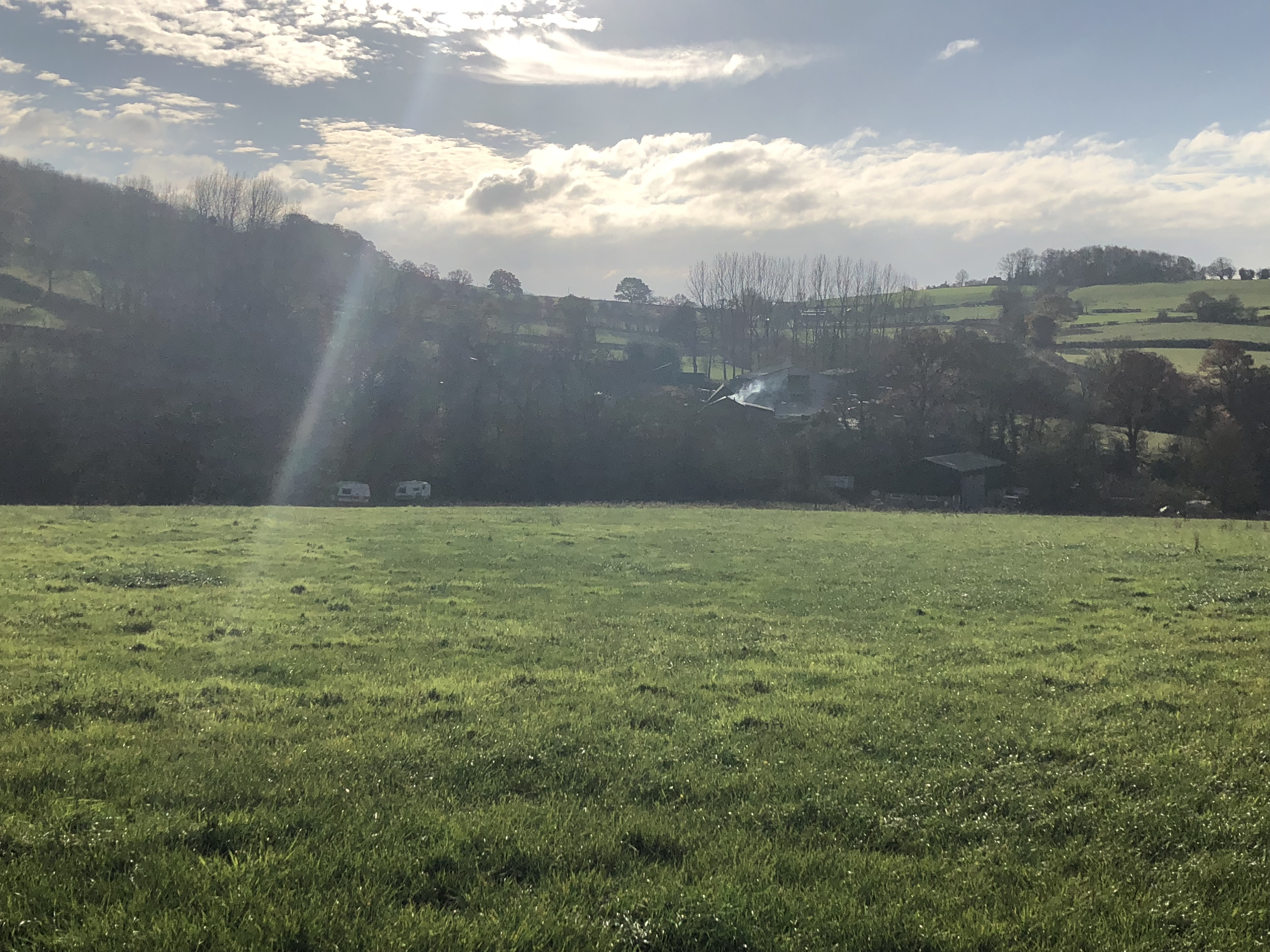
- "well-preserved and exceptionally rare"

- Location within Monmouthshire
- 51.8556°N 2.902°W
- Type: Barn
- Location: Llantilio Crossenny, Monmouthshire

History
- Built: c.1550

Site notes
- Governing body: Privately owned

Listed Building – Grade II*
- Official name: Barn at Croft Farm
- Designated: 19 November 1953
- Reference no.: 2077

The Barn at Croft Farm, Llantilio Crossenny, Monmouthshire is a remarkably rare example of a 16th-century barn. Originally built as part of the Great Tre-Rhew Estate, it is a Grade II* listing building.

== History ==
The barn was constructed circa. 1550 as a corn barn. The barn's importance was noticed by Sir Cyril Fox and Lord Raglan who recorded it in their three-volume guide Monmouthshire Houses. By the 21st century, it was in a state of dereliction and on the Buildings at Risk register but is now in the process of being restored.

== Architecture and description ==
The architectural historian John Newman describes Croft Farm Barn as "remarkable". The barn is cruck-framed with weatherboarding to the ground floor and with wattle panels above. The building materials are stone and timber. The barn is listed Grade II*, its listing record noting its "exceptionally rare (status) and fine carpentry".
