= St Bridget's Church, Skenfrith =

Coordinates: 51.8790°N 2.7916°W

Church of St Bridget, Skenfrith
- Church of St Bridget
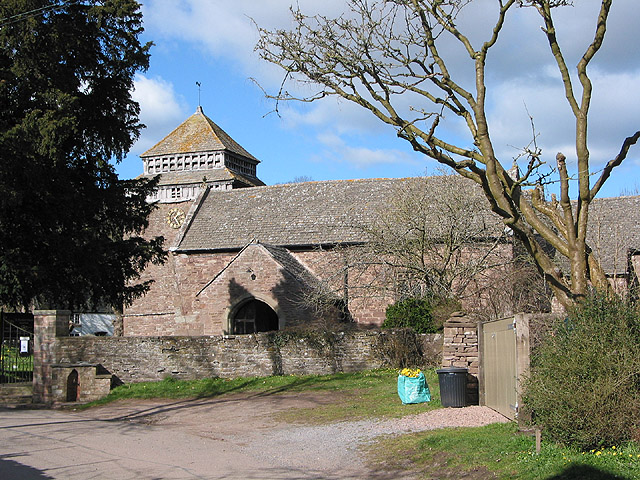
- "an important medieval church"

- Location in Monmouthshire
- OS grid reference: SO456203
- Location: Skenfrith, Monmouthshire
- Country: Wales
- Denomination: Church in Wales
- Website: Church website

History
- Status: parish church
- Founded: c.13th century

Architecture
- Functional status: Active
- Heritage designation: Grade I
- Designated: 19 November 1953
- Architectural type: Church
- Style: Early English

Administration
- Diocese: Monmouth
- Archdeaconry: Monmouth
- Deanery: Abergavenny
- Parish: Skenfrith

Clergy
- Vicar: Vacant
- Priest: The Reverend G E Burrett

The Church of St Bridget (or St Bride) lies at the north end of the village of Skenfrith, Monmouthshire, Wales. It is an active parish church and a Grade I listed building. The church is dedicated to St Brigit (Welsh: Sant Ffraid), to whom 17 churches are dedicated across the country.

== History ==
The church is medieval in origin, with the earliest parts believed to date from the reign of King John (1166–1216). It was extended in the fourteenth and again in the sixteenth century, sympathetically restored in 1896 and again in 1909–10. The dedication is to St Bridget.

Services are held at the church every Sunday at 9.15.

== Architecture and description ==
The nave, looking east to the chancel

The church is constructed of Old Red Sandstone. It comprises a two-aisled nave, chancel and a West tower. The tower is topped by a dovecote belfry with a pyramidal roof.

The interior contains the "very fine" chest tomb of John Morgan, died 1557, who was Member of Parliament for the Monmouth Boroughs, Steward of the Duchy of Lancaster and last Governor of the Three Castles, of Skenfrith, Grosmont and White Castle. A lectern of 1909 by the Arts and Crafts designer, George Jack, incorporates a figure of St Bridget.

The church is a Grade I listed building, its listing describing St Bridget's as "an important medieval church with an exceptionally good interior".
