= Three Castles =

Former medieval lordship in Wales

Map of Monmouthshire, Wales, showing the locations of the Three Castles:
Grosmont Castle
Skenfrith Castle
White Castle

The Three Castles was a former medieval lordship, comprising the fortifications of Grosmont, Skenfrith and White Castle in Monmouthshire, Wales. The castles were established by the Normans in the wake of their conquest of England in 1066, to protect the route from Wales to Hereford. Possibly commissioned by William fitz Osbern, the Earl of Hereford, they initially comprised earthwork fortifications with timber defences. In 1135, a major Welsh revolt took place and in response King Stephen brought the castles together to form the lordship, which continued to play a role in defending the region for several centuries.

Some work was carried out to develop the castles in the 12th century, but their current form mainly dates from the 13th century. In 1201, King John gave the castles to a powerful royal official, Hubert de Burgh. During the course of the next few decades, the lordship passed back and forth between several owners, including Hubert, the rival de Braose family, and the Crown. During his tenure, Hubert completely levelled and rebuilt Skenfrith Castle, and substantially redeveloped Grosmont. White Castle was probably rebuilt in the 1250s and 1260s during the reign of Henry III.

In 1267, the three castles were granted to Edmund, the Earl of Lancaster, and remained in the hands of the earldom, and later duchy, of Lancaster until 1825. King Edward I's conquest of Wales removed much of the castles' utility, however, and by the 16th century they had fallen into disuse and ruin. In the early 20th century, the ruins were gradually placed into the care of the state, and are now managed by the Cadw Welsh heritage agency. The sites are linked by a modern footpath known as the Three Castles Walk.

== History ==
=== 11th-12th centuries ===
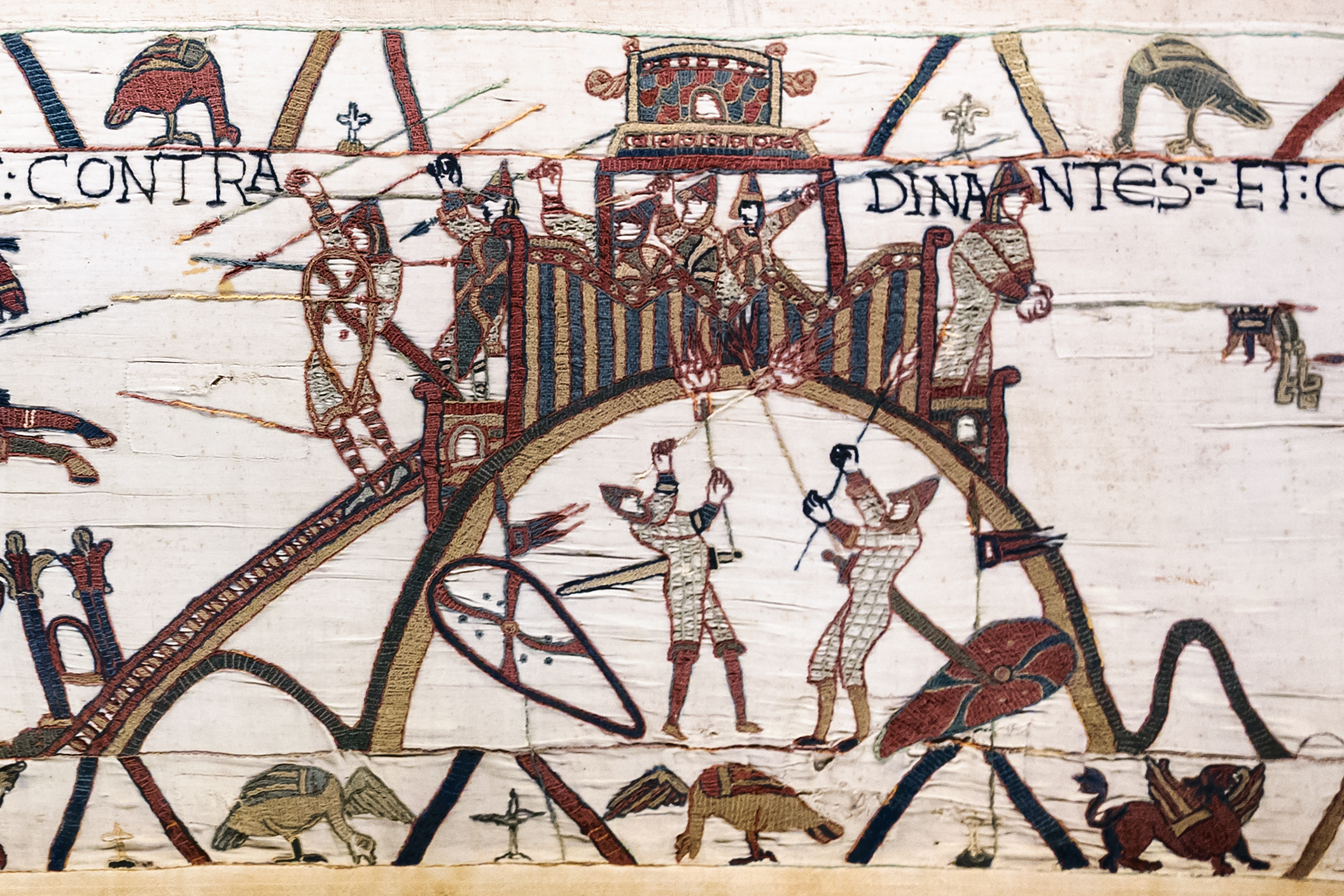
The construction of earth and timber castles were essential to the Norman conquest of England and the Welsh Marches

The fortifications that came to make up the lordship of the "Three Castles" were built in the wake of the Norman invasion of England in 1066. Shortly after the invasion, the Normans pushed up into the Welsh Marches, where William the Conqueror made William fitz Osbern the Earl of Hereford. Earl William added further to his new lands, capturing the towns of Monmouth and Chepstow. The Normans used castles extensively to subdue the Welsh, establish new settlements and exert their claims of lordship over the territories.

Grosmont, Skenfrith, and White Castle were all constructed in the Monnow valley around this time, possibly by Earl William himself, to protect the route from Wales to Hereford. The first castles on these sites were built from earth and timber. The earldom's landholdings in the region were slowly broken up after William's son, Roger de Breteuil, rebelled against the King in 1075. In 1135, a major Welsh revolt took place, however, and in response King Stephen restructured the landholdings along this section of the Marches, bringing the castles back under the control of the Crown to form the lordship known as the "Three Castles".

Conflict with the Welsh continued, and following a period of détente under King Henry II in the 1160s, the de Mortimer and de Braose Marcher families attacked their Welsh rivals during the 1170s, leading to a Welsh assault on nearby Abergavenny Castle in 1182. In response, the Crown readied the castle to face an attack, including rebuilding parts of Skenfrith and White Castle in stone.

=== 13th-17th centuries ===
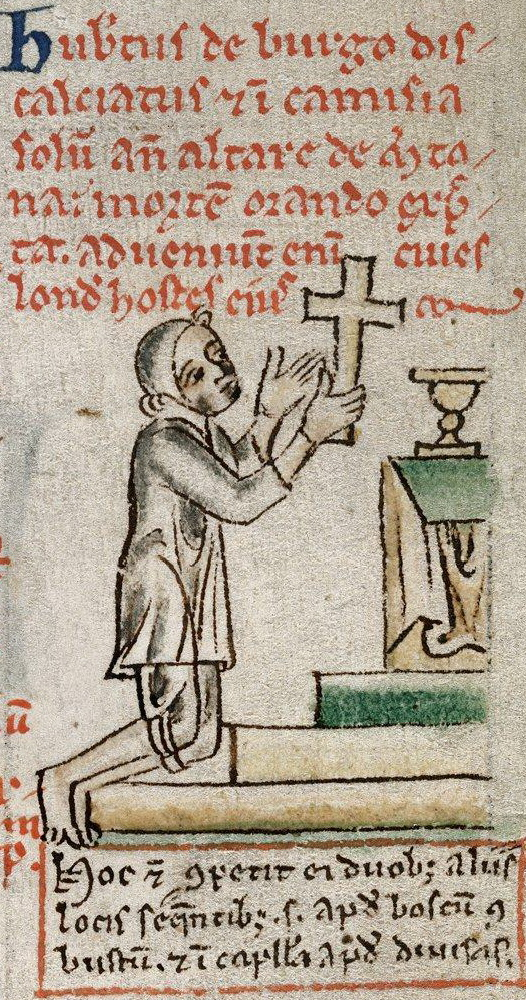
Hubert de Burgh, who redeveloped large parts of the castles; depicted here following his fall from power in 1234, by Matthew Paris

In 1201, King John gave the Three Castles to Hubert de Burgh. Hubert was a minor landowner who had become John's household chamberlain when he was still a prince, and went on to become an increasingly powerful royal official once John had inherited the throne. Hubert began to upgrade his new castles, starting with Grosmont, but was captured while fighting in France. While he was in captivity, King John took back the Three Castles and gave them to William de Braose, an enemy of Hubert's. The king subsequently fell out with William and dispossessed him of his lands in 1207, but de Braose's son, also called William, took the opportunity presented by the First Barons' War to retake the castles.

Once released, Hubert regained his grip on power, becoming the justiciar and the Earl of Kent, before finally recovering the Three Castles in 1219 during the reign of King Henry III. During Hubert's tenure, Skenfrith was entirely rebuilt; the old castle was levelled and a new rectangular castle with round towers and a central circular keep built in stone in its place.

Hubert fell from power in 1232 and was stripped of the castles again, which were placed under the command of Walerund Teutonicus, a royal servant. Henry led an army into Wales in 1233 against the rebellious Richard Marshall, the Earl of Pembroke, and his Welsh allies, and camped outside Grosmont Castle that November. Richard carried out a night attack on their encampment, and, while not taking the castle itself, he forced the rest of the king's army to flee in confusion. Having been reconciled with the king in 1234, the castles were returned to Hubert briefly, but he fell out with King Henry III once more in 1239 and they were taken back and assigned again to Walerund.

In 1254, the lordship was granted to King Henry's eldest son and later king, Prince Edward. The castles were readied in response to Llywelyn ap Gruffudd's attack on Abergavenny in 1262; Skenfrith Castle, under the command of Gilbert Talbot, was ordered to be garrisoned "by every man, and at whatever cost", but the threat passed without incident. Edmund, the Earl of Lancaster and the capitaneus of the royal forces in Wales, was given the lordship in 1267 and for many centuries it was held by the earldom, and later duchy, of Lancaster.

King Edward I's conquest of Wales in 1282 removed much of threes castles' military utility, although they continued to be maintained and used as administrative centres. The castles' last military involvement was Grosmont's role during the revolt of Owain Glyndŵr at the start of the 15th century. Grosmont was attacked in 1405 by Owain's son, Gruffudd, but was relieved by an English force sent by Prince Henry. By 1538, the castles had fallen into disuse and then into dilapidation; a 1613 description noted that they were "ruynous and decayed".

=== 18th-21st centuries ===
In 1825, the three castles were sold off to Henry Somerset, the Duke of Beaufort. The estate was broken up in 1902 and sold on to various private owners, who carried out some conservation of the site. The castles were placed into the care of the state during the early 20th century, and extensive repair work was carried out. In the 21st century, the three castles are managed by the Welsh heritage agency Cadw and protected under UK law as grade I and grade II* listed buildings. A 30 kilometres (19 mi) long modern footpath called the Three Castles Walk connects the castles.

== The castles ==
Name	Image	Plan	Location	Description
Grosmont Castle			Grosmont; 51.915278°N 2.865833°W	Grosmont Castle dates mostly from the 13th century with later 14th-century additions. It originally comprised an inner and an outer ward, but the latter has been encroached upon by local gardens. The inner ward forms a stone castle with a gatehouse, two circular mural towers, a hall and a north accommodation block, protected by a ditch. Originally other timber buildings would have been raised against the outer stone wall as accommodation for the castle's servants, but only limited traces of these survive. The north block of the inner ward has a distinctive octagonal chimney with a carved top.
Skenfrith Castle			Skenfrith; 51.8784°N 2.7902°W	Skenfrith Castle dates from the early 13th century, when the original 11th- and 12th-century castle was flattened. The castle forms a polygon, and was originally protected by a stone-revetted, water-filled moat fed by the river. The curtain wall survives, with circular towers on each corner. A two-storey hall range stretched across the south-western inside of the castle, of which only the foundations now survive. The three-story circular keep in the middle of the castle has a protruding staircase tower on its south-western side.
White Castle			Llantilio Crossenny; 51.8454°N 2.9029°W	White Castle dates mainly from the 13th century and is made up of a central inner ward, a crescent-shaped hornwork to the south, and an outer ward to the north. The outer ward was originally much larger, extending around the castle further to the east, but only limited traces of these earthworks survive. Buildings stretched around the inside of the inner ward, including the hall, the constable's living quarters, the chapel, service buildings and the kitchen block. The historian Paul Remfry considers the castle to be "a masterpiece of military engineering".

== Sources ==
=== Bibliography ===
- Davies, R. R. (2006) [1990]. Domination and Conquest: The Experience of Ireland, Scotland and Wales, 1100-1300. Cambridge, UK: Cambridge University Press. ISBN 978-0-52102-977-3.
- Holden, Brock W. (2008). Lords of the Central Marches: English Aristocracy and Frontier Society, 1087-1265. Oxford, UK: Oxford University Press. ISBN 978-0-19-954857-6.
- Knight, Jeremy K. (2009) [1991]. The Three Castles: Grosmont Castle, Skenfrith Castle, White Castle (revised ed.). Cardiff, UK: Cadw. ISBN 978-1-85760-266-1.
- Radford, C. A. Ralegh (1959) [1949]. Skenfrith Castle, Monmouthshire. London, UK: Her Majesty's Stationery Office. OCLC 27818100.
- Radford, C. A. Ralegh (1962). White Castle, Monmouthshire. London, UK: Her Majesty's Stationery Office. OCLC 30258313.
- Remfry, Paul (2010–2011). "White Castle and the Dating of the Towers" (PDF). The Castle Studies Group Journal (24): 213–226.
- Royal Commission on Ancient Monuments in Wales and Monmouthshire (1912). Minutes of Evidence Given Before the Royal Commission on Ancient Monuments in Wales and Monmouthshire. London, UK: His Majesty's Stationery Office. OCLC 757802640.
- Taylor, A. J. (1961). "White Castle in the Thirteenth Century: A Re-Consideration". Medieval Archaeology. 5: 169–175. doi:10.1080/00766097.1961.11735651.

=== Online ===
- Cadw. "White Castle Ruins (Grade I) (2079)". National Historic Assets of Wales.
- Cadw. "Skenfrith Castle (Grade II*) (2083)". National Historic Assets of Wales.
- Cadw. "Grosmont Castle (MM007)". National Historic Assets of Wales.
