= Skenfrith =

Skenfrith: Welsh: Ynysgynwraidd
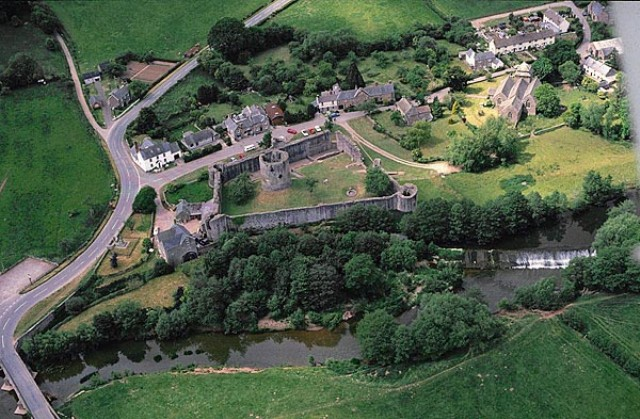
- Skenfrith from the air, showing the castle and River Monnow

- Location within Monmouthshire
- OS grid reference: SO457201
- Community: Skenfrith
- Principal area: Monmouthshire
- Preserved county: Gwent
- Country: Wales
- Sovereign state: United Kingdom
- Post town: Abergavenny
- Postcode district: NP7
- Dialling code: 01600
- Police: Gwent
- Fire: South Wales
- Ambulance: Welsh
- UK Parliament: Monmouth
- Senedd Cymru – Welsh Parliament: Monmouth
- List of places UK Wales Monmouthshire 51.877°N 2.788°W Map of the community

Skenfrith (Welsh: Ynysgynwraidd) is a small village in Monmouthshire, south-east Wales. It is located on the River Monnow, close to the border between Wales and England, about 6 miles (9.7 km) north-west of Monmouth.

== History and amenities ==
The Welsh placename Ynysgynwraidd, from which the English name derives, means "island of Cynfraeth", possibly a local 6th century leader.

Skenfrith Castle was originally established after the successful 1066 Norman invasion of England to guard the route from Wales to Hereford. After a Welsh revolt in 1135 on the death of Henry I, King Stephen brought it back under Crown control, incorporating it into the lordship of the Three Castles with Grosmont Castle and White Castle. The castle was substantially rebuilt by Hubert de Burgh between 1219 and 1223, but by 1538 it was abandoned and in ruins.

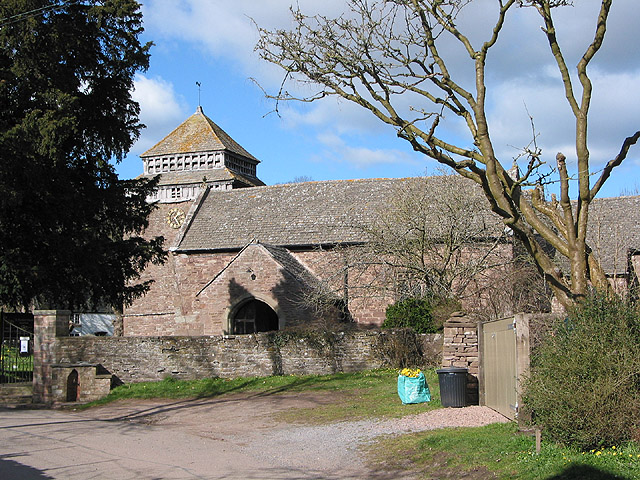
St. Bridget's Church, Skenfrith

St. Bridget's Church, Skenfrith is believed to date to the reign of King John (1199–1216) and was reconstructed and enlarged in the 14th century. The church has a squat tower and large buttress. The church is listed Grade I by CADW. The interior has a Jacobean pew and the tomb of John Morgan, the last governor of the Three Castles. It also holds the Skenfrith Cope, an embroidered vestment of red velvet and linen which has been dated to the late 15th century. Its design shows the Assumption of the Virgin, surrounded by angels and saints.

The village gave its name to one of the historic hundreds of Monmouthshire.

The Bell at Skenfrith, originally a 17th-century coaching inn, was voted Michelin 2007 Pub of the Year, for the whole of Great Britain.

In 2022 Skenfrith became a community, formed from parts of Crucorney, Llangattock-Vibon-Avel and Llantilio Crossenny communities.

== Friends of St. Bridget's ==
There is an active secular charity, the Friends of St. Bridget's, Skenfrith, which supports the repair and maintenance of the church and has raised funds, in particular for the recent conservation project and new display and conservation of the pre-reformation cope. Patrons include the Lord Lieutenant of Gwent Simon Boyle, Sara Fulgoni and Sir Roy Strong.

== In popular culture ==
Skenfrith was used as the location for the fictional village of "Upper Leadworth" in the Doctor Who episodes "Amy's Choice", broadcast on 22 May 2010 and the related Doctor Who Confidential episode "Arthurian Legend". In the episode quoted Skenfrith was labelled as the village which time forgot.
