= Barn, Stable and Cider House, Great Tre-Rhew Farm, Llantilio Crossenny =

Barn, Stable and Cider House, Great Tre-Rhew Farm
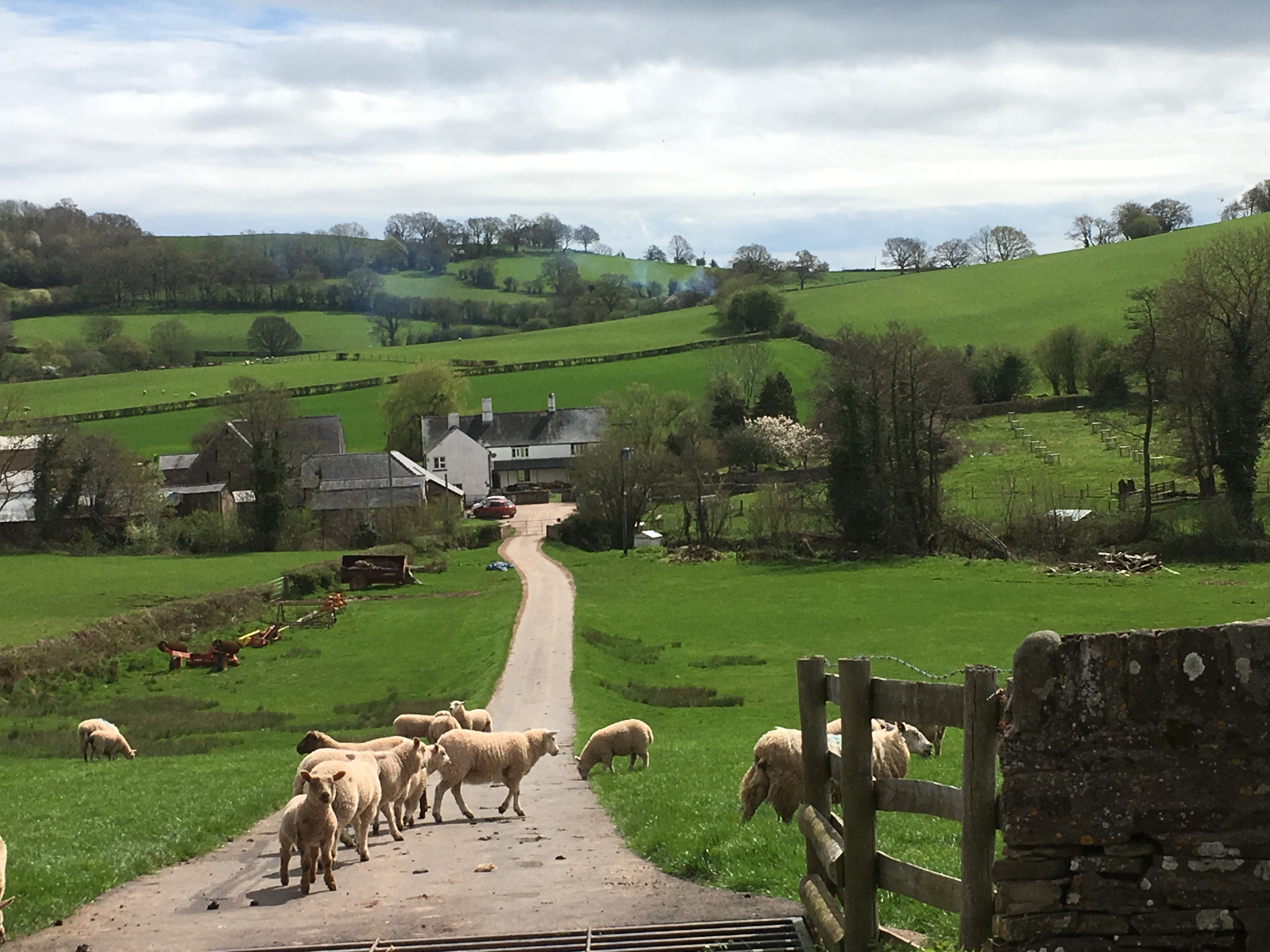
- "An unusually ambitious, exceptionally well-preserved farm range"

- Location within Monmouthshire
- 51.8547°N 2.905°W
- Type: Barn
- Location: Llantilio Crossenny, Monmouthshire

History
- Built: 17th century

Site notes
- Architectural style: Vernacular
- Governing body: Privately owned

Listed Building – Grade II*
- Official name: Corn Barn with attached Stable and lofted Cider House at Great Tre-Rhew
- Designated: 27 October 2000
- Reference no.: 24302

Listed Building – Grade II
- Official name: Great Tre-Rhew Farmhouse
- Designated: 27 October 2000
- Reference no.: 24301

Listed Building – Grade II
- Official name: Granary and Brewhouse at Great Tre-Rhew
- Designated: 27 October 2000
- Reference no.: 24303

Listed Building – Grade II
- Official name: Shelter Shed at Great Tre-Rhew
- Designated: 27 October 2000
- Reference no.: 24304

The Corn Barn, Stable and Cider House at Great Tre-Rhew Farm, Llantilio Crossenny, Monmouthshire form part of "one of the most completely surviving farmsteads in the county". Constructed in the late 17th century, the corn barn is an eight-bay structure with the stable and cider house forming two, gabled, linked additions. The whole is a Grade II* listed structure. The other buildings that comprise the farmstead include the farmhouse, a granary and brewhouse, and a shelter shed, all of which have their own Grade II listings.

== History ==
The farmhouse at Great Tre-Rhew is of late-medieval origin, although the majority of the existing buildings are later, of the Tudor period. The corn barn, stable and cider house were constructed in the late 17th century, with the stable carrying a datestone of 1696. In the 17th century, the farm was owned by the Price family. The architectural historian John Newman describes the barn and associated farm buildings as the features of the site "which really impress". The farm remains a privately owned working farm and the barn was restored in the early 21st century.

== Architecture and description ==
The barn is built of red sandstone rubble and is of an eight-bay construction. The roof is of slate. The stable and cider house form adjoining, gabled, wings. The whole structure is listed Grade II*. The farmhouse, granary and brewhouse, and the shelter shed have their own Grade II listings.
