= Llantilio Crossenny =

Village in Monmouthshire, Wales

Coordinates: 51.827568°N 2.877136°W

Llantilio Crossenny: Welsh: Llandeilo Gresynni
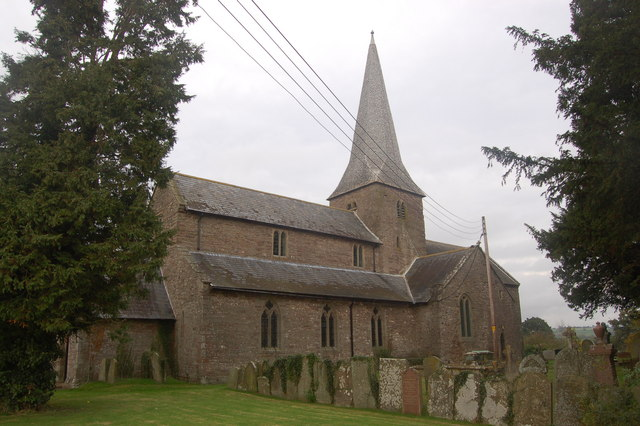
- Church of St Teilo

- Location within Monmouthshire
- Population: 731 (2011)
- OS grid reference: SO398147
- Community: Whitecastle
- Principal area: Monmouthshire
- Preserved county: Gwent
- Country: Wales
- Sovereign state: United Kingdom
- Post town: ABERGAVENNY
- Postcode district: NP7
- Dialling code: 01873
- Police: Gwent
- Fire: South Wales
- Ambulance: Welsh
- UK Parliament: Monmouth

Llantilio Crossenny (Welsh: Llandeilo Gresynni) is a small village and much larger former community, abolished in 2022, now in the community of Whitecastle, in Monmouthshire, south east Wales, in the United Kingdom. Part of the old community is now part of Skenfrith community. It is situated between the towns of Abergavenny and Monmouth, on the B4233. The community included Penrhos, and Llanvihangel-Ystern-Llewern.

== History ==
In January 2015 metal detectorists unearthed axe and spear heads, thought to be around 3,000 years old, in a field near the village. The items are thought to date back to Ewart Park phase of the late Bronze Age, about 1000-800 BC. The Principal Curator of Prehistory at Amgueddfa Cymru – National Museum Wales, Adam Gwilt, said: "Many whole and still usable bronze objects were carefully buried in the ground at this particular time and archaeologists now think that these may have been gifts to the gods and ancestors, buried during ritual ceremonies. It is curious that this place in the landscape was chosen for the burial of two hoards of the same date and very close to each other."

The site of the village, or at least the locality, is associated with a battle between a Dark Ages King of the Welsh Kingdom of Gwent, Ynyr, and the incoming Saxons. The village is also associated with the incoming Normans in Wales who built many castles in this border area of the Welsh Marches and with Dafydd Gam, a local warrior and Welsh ally of King Henry V.

A Free Grammar School was founded in the village, on 10 August 1654, by James Powell, Gentleman of Cymmerau. In 1924 a history of the grammar school was published by local historian Sir Joseph Bradney.

== Notable sites ==
=== St Teilo's church ===
The Church of St Teilo dates from the 13th century and is "an unusually grand cruciform church." It is a Grade I listed building and is dedicated to Saint Teilo.

=== White Castle ===
White Castle is a fine example of the medieval castle-builders art which stands on the hill overlooking the village. The Three Castles Walk passes close by. The fortification was established by the Normans in the wake of the invasion of England in 1066, to protect the route from Wales to Hereford. Possibly commissioned by William fitz Osbern, the Earl of Hereford, it comprised three large earthworks with timber defences.

=== Hen Gwrt ===
Hen Gwrt is the site of a thirteenth-century manor house and a sixteenth-century hunting lodge. Originally constructed for the Bishops of Llandaff, it subsequently came into the possession of the Herberts of Raglan Castle.

=== Llantilio Court (since demolished) ===
Sir Henry Jackson, 2nd Baronet (1831–1881) Member of Parliament (MP) for Coventry from 1867-1868 and 1874–1881, and a Deputy Lieutenant of Monmouthshire lived at Llantilio Court from 1873 until his death in 1881. His son, Sir Henry Mather-Jackson, 3rd Baronet, bought the lordship of the manor of Llantilio Crossenny and the ruins of White Castle from the 9th Duke of Beaufort in May 1902. Llantilio Court was demolished in 1922 but remnants of the landscape park remain and are listed on the Cadw/ICOMOS Register of Parks and Gardens of Special Historic Interest in Wales.

== Culture ==
The Offa's Dyke path passes through the village. Llantilio Crossenny holds an annual festival of music and drama which was co-founded in the 1960s by Welsh composer Mansel Thomas.

== Governance ==
An electoral Ward in the same name exists. This ward stretches north to Llangattock-Vibon-Avel. The total population of this ward at the 2011 census was 1,755. In the 2022 local elections, Paul Chandler became Monmouthshire's first Green councillor after being elected to represent the Llantilio Crossenny electoral ward. Llantilio Crossenny community (parish) elected a Community Council of nine members.

== Gallery ==
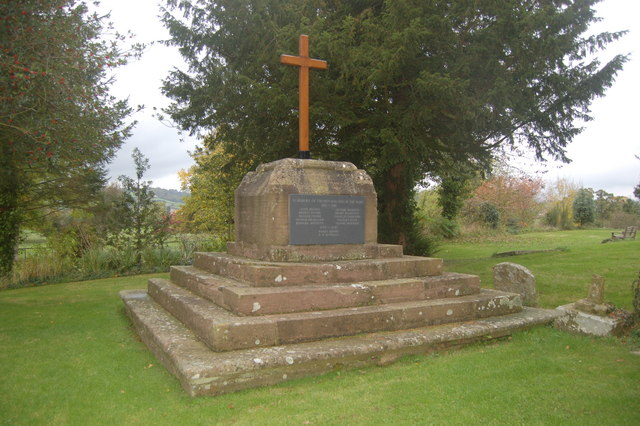
The war memorial

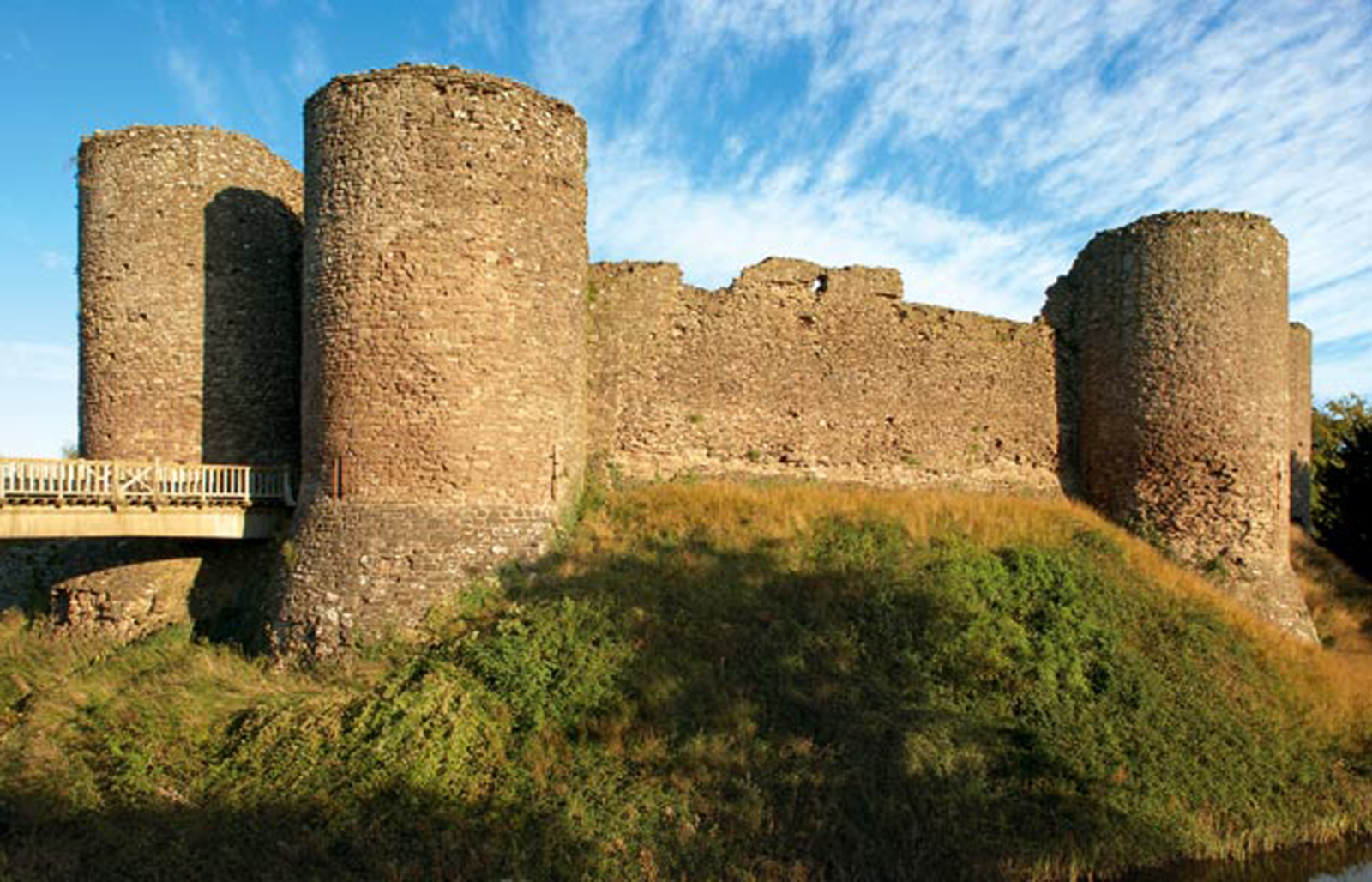
White Castle

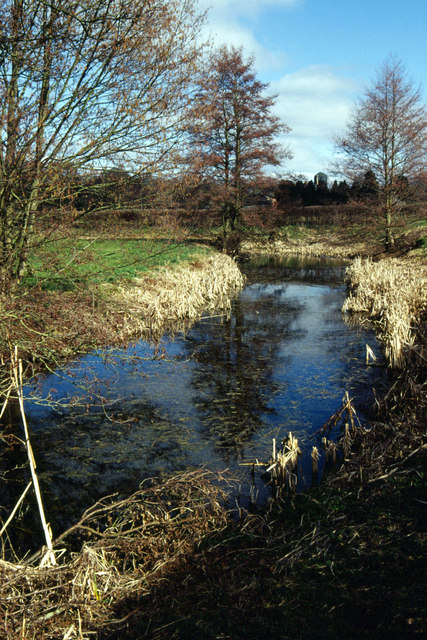
Hen Gwrt moated site

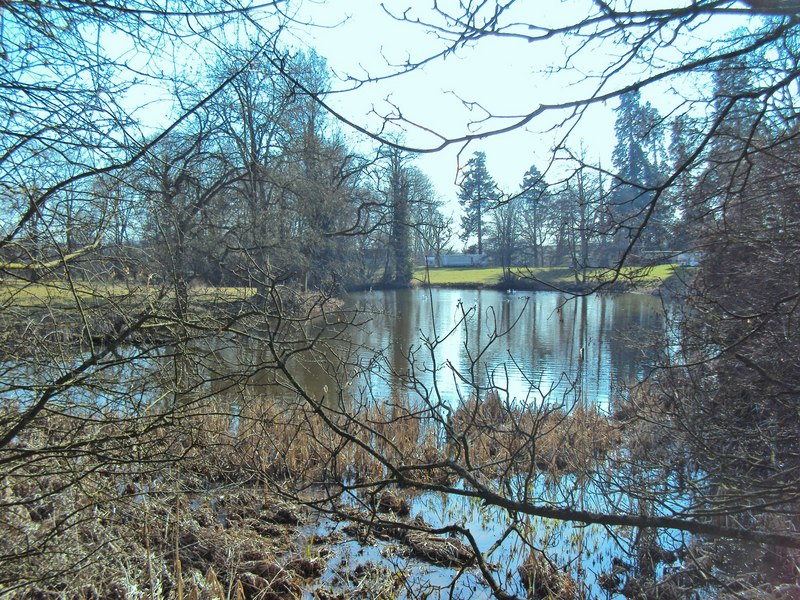
Park of the now demolished Llantilio Court

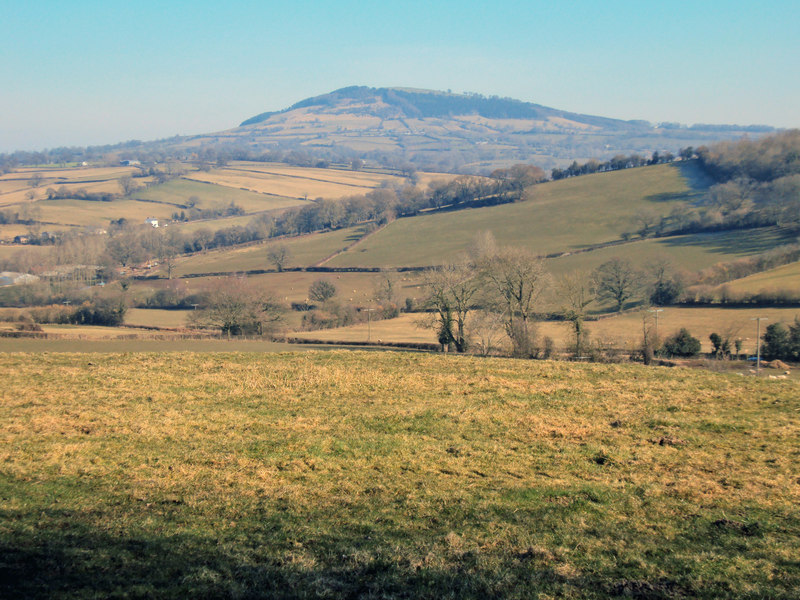
Farmland near Caggle Street

== Sources ==
- Newman, John (2000). Gwent/Monmouthshire. The Buildings of Wales. London: Penguin. ISBN 0-14-071053-1.
