= Three Castles Walk, Monmouthshire =

Footpath in Wales

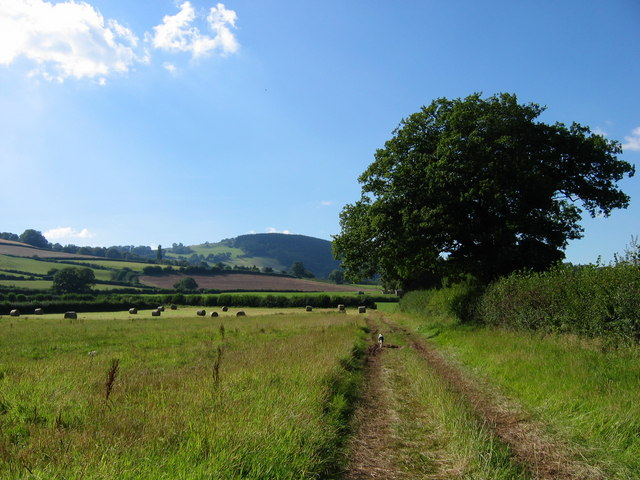
A section of the Three Castles Walk between Skenfrith and Grosmont

The Three Castles Walk is a waymarked long-distance footpath and recreational walk in north-east Monmouthshire, Wales, linking Skenfrith, Grosmont and White Castles.

== Distance ==
The Three Castles Walk covers 31.2 kilometres (19.4 mi) on a roughly triangular route.

== Route ==
The route links Skenfrith Castle (51.8783°N 2.7903°W), Grosmont Castle (51.9154°N 2.8661°W) and White Castle (51.8460°N 2.9021°W). It follows woods and hills and takes the walker over Graig Syfyrddin (Edmunds Tump), from which there are views of the Welsh Marches, the mountains of South Wales, including the Black Mountains, and the Forest of Dean and beyond.

The Three Castles Walk links with the Offa's Dyke Path (at White Castle) and the Monnow Valley Walk (at Skenfrith and Grosmont).
