= White Castle, Monmouthshire =

Ruined castle in Monmouthshire, Wales

White Castle
- Monmouthshire, Wales
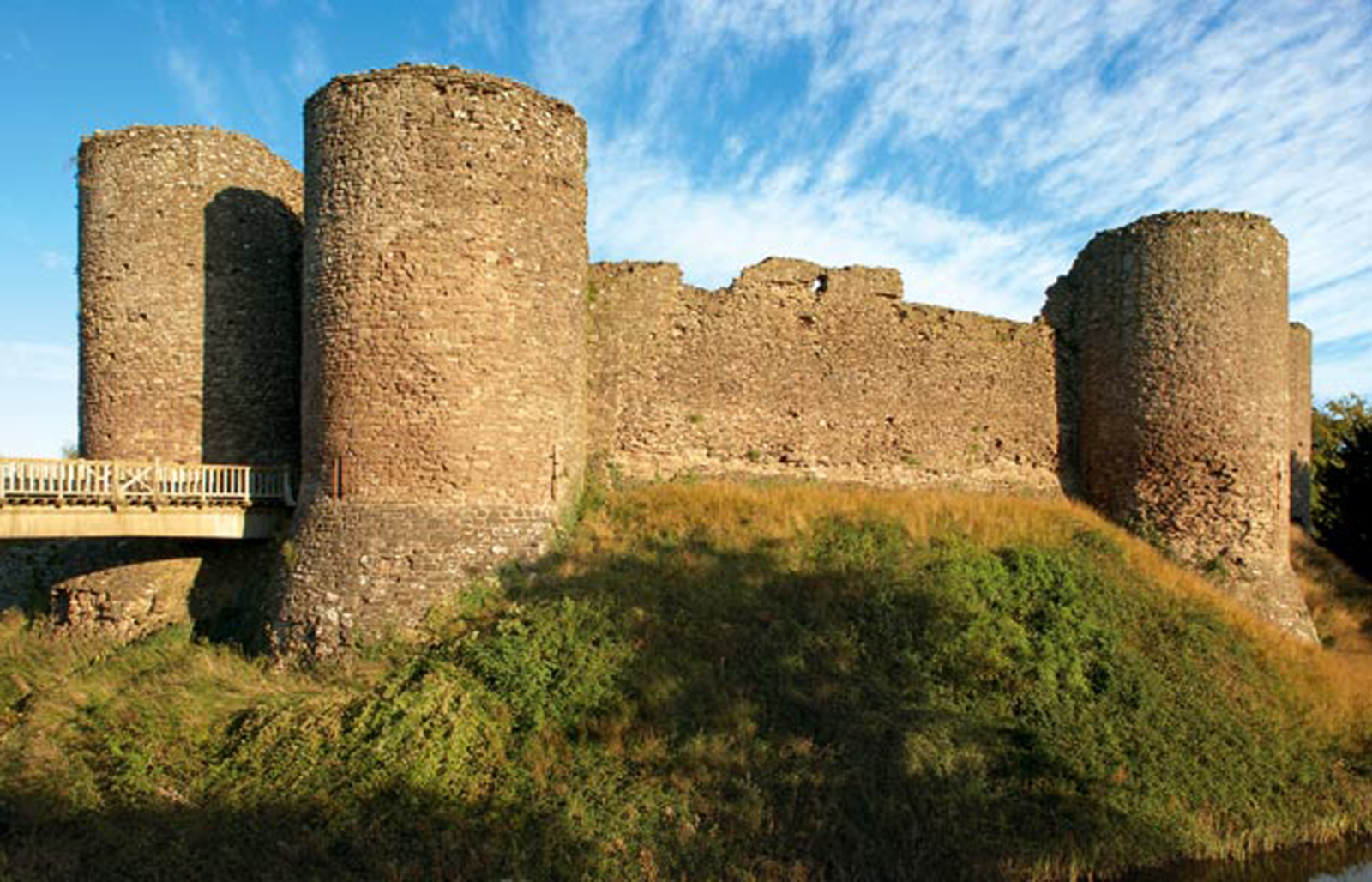
- Gatehouse and curtain wall of the inner ward, seen from the outer ward

Site information
- Controlled by: Cadw
- Open to the public: Yes
- Condition: Ruined

Location
- Shown within Monmouthshire
- Coordinates: 51.8454°N 2.9029°W

Site history
- Materials: Red sandstone
- Events: Norman invasion of Wales

Listed Building – Grade I
- Designated: 19 November 1953
- Reference no.: 300002079

White Castle (Welsh: Castell Gwyn), also known historically as Llantilio Castle, is a ruined castle near the village of Llantilio Crossenny in Monmouthshire, Wales. The fortification was established by the Normans in the wake of the invasion of England in 1066, to protect the route from Wales to Hereford. Possibly commissioned by William fitz Osbern, the Earl of Hereford, it comprised three large earthworks with timber defences. In 1135, a major Welsh revolt took place and in response King Stephen brought together White Castle and its sister fortifications of Grosmont and Skenfrith to form a lordship known as the "Three Castles", which continued to play a role in defending the region from Welsh attack for several centuries.

King John gave the castle to a powerful royal official, Hubert de Burgh, in 1201. Over the next few decades, it passed back and forth between several owners, as Hubert, the rival de Braose family, and the Crown took control of the property. During this period, White Castle was substantially rebuilt, with stone curtain walls, mural towers and gatehouses, forming what the historian Paul Remfry considers to be "a masterpiece of military engineering". In 1267 it was granted to Edmund, the Earl of Lancaster, and remained in the hands of the earldom, and later duchy, of Lancaster until 1825.

Edward I's conquest of Wales in 1282 removed much of White Castle's military utility, and by the 16th century it had fallen into disuse and ruin. The castle was placed into the care of the state in 1922, and is now managed by Cadw, the Welsh heritage agency.

== History ==
=== 11th–12th centuries ===
White Castle was built in the wake of the Norman invasion of England in 1066. Shortly after the invasion, the Normans pushed into the Welsh Marches, where William the Conqueror made William fitz Osbern the Earl of Hereford; Earl William added to his new lands by capturing the towns of Monmouth and Chepstow. The Normans used castles extensively to subdue the Welsh, establish new settlements and exert their claims of lordship over the territories.

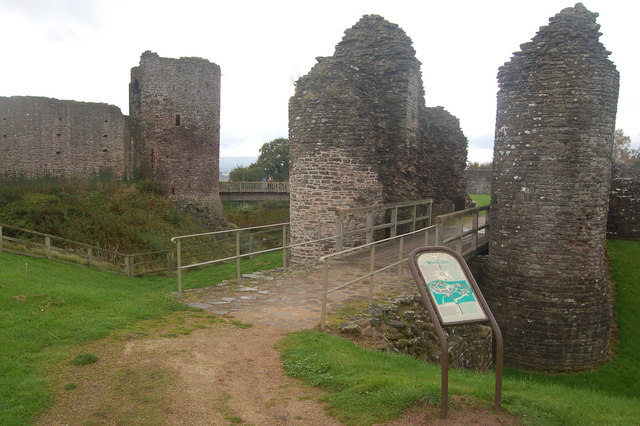
The outer ward's gatehouse

Originally called Llantilio Castle, White Castle was one of three fortifications built in the Monnow valley around the same time, possibly by Earl William himself, to protect the route from Wales to Hereford, and overlooked the manor of Llantilio Crossenny and the River Monnow. The first castle on the site was built from earth and timber, with three large earthworks forming an inner and outer ward, and a hornwork protecting the main entrance to the south. A mill was constructed at Great Trerhew to grind corn for the castle garrison.

The earldom's landholdings in the region were slowly broken up after William's son, Roger de Breteuil, rebelled against the Crown in 1075. In 1135, a major Welsh revolt took place, and in response King Stephen restructured the landholdings along this section of the Marches, bringing White Castle and its sister fortifications of Grosmont and Skenfrith back under the control of the Crown to form a lordship known as the "Three Castles".

Conflict with the Welsh continued, and following a period of detente under Henry II in the 1160s, the de Mortimer and de Braose Marcher families attacked their Welsh rivals during the 1170s, leading to a Welsh assault on nearby Abergavenny Castle in 1182. In response, the Crown readied the castle to face an attack and, between 1184 and 1186, work costing £128 (Note: Comparison of medieval financial figures with modern equivalents is challenging. For comparison, the average annual income of a baron during this period was around £200.) was carried out by Ralph of Grosmont, a royal official, probably to build a stone curtain wall around the inner ward and to add a small stone keep to the defences.

=== 13th–17th centuries ===
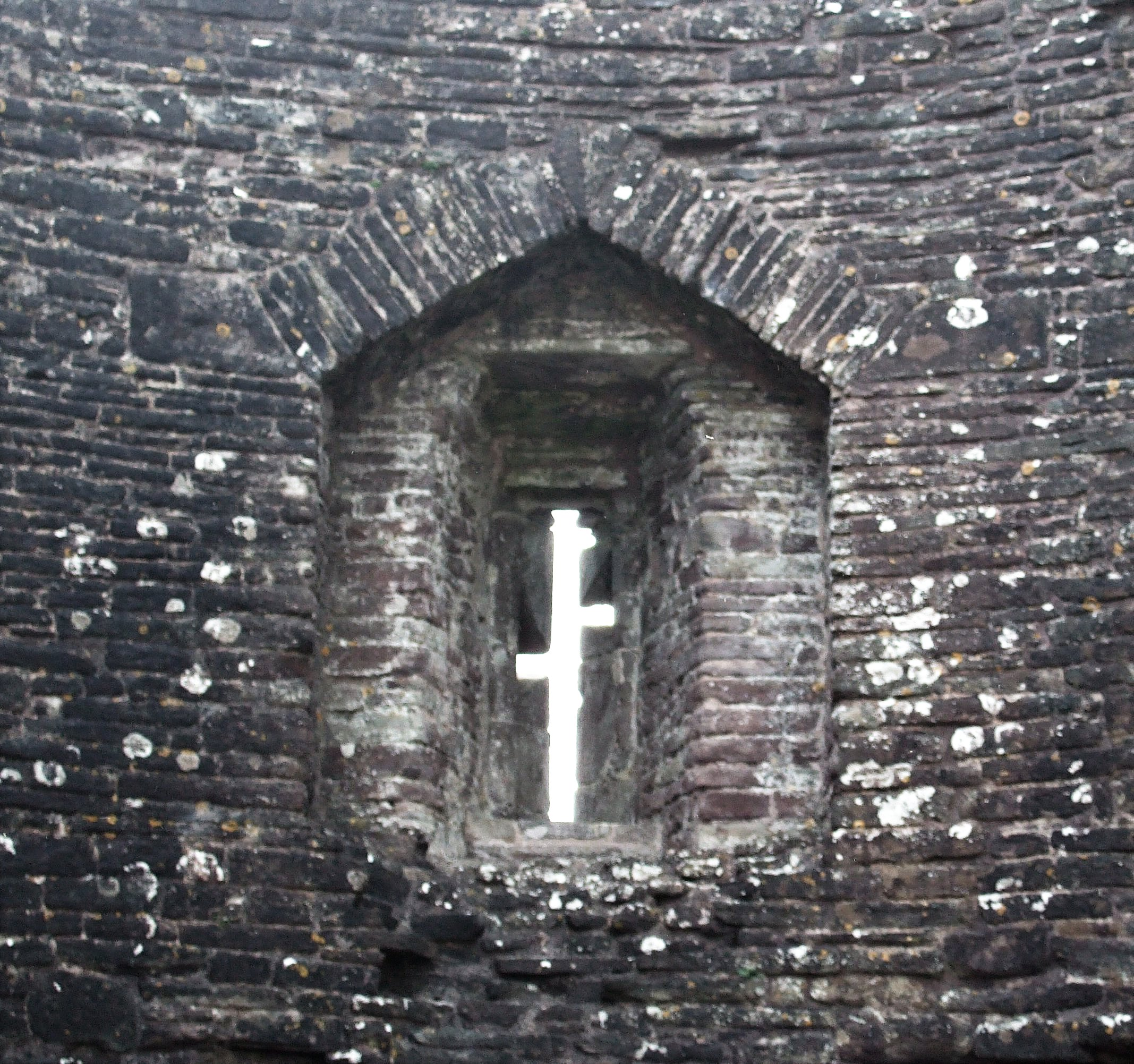
The castle's unusual arrow loops

In 1201, King John gave the Three Castles to Hubert de Burgh. Hubert was a minor landowner who had become John's household chamberlain when he was still a prince, and went on to become an increasingly powerful royal official once John inherited the throne. At this time, White Castle was primarily a military fortification, holding a garrison and stores of arrows and crossbow bolts. It was relatively exposed to the elements and had, at best, only basic accommodation; the historian Cathcart King describes the conditions in the castle as likely to have been "miserable", "squalid" and "unpleasant".

Hubert began to upgrade his new castles, starting with Grosmont, but was captured while fighting in France. During Hubert's captivity, King John took back the Three Castles and gave them to William de Braose, a rival of Hubert's. King John subsequently fell out with William and dispossessed him of his lands in 1207, but de Braose's son, also called William, took the opportunity presented by the First Barons' War to retake the castles.

Once released, Hubert regained his grip on power, becoming the royal justiciar and being made the Earl of Kent, before finally recovering the Three Castles in 1219 during the reign of King Henry III. Hubert fell from power in 1232 and was stripped of the castles, which were placed under the command of Walerund Teutonicus, a royal servant; having been reconciled with the King in 1234, the castles were briefly returned to Hubert, but he fell out with King Henry III again in 1239 and they were taken back and assigned to Walerund. Walerund built a new hall, buttery and pantry at the castle in 1244. In 1254, White Castle and its sister fortifications were granted to King Henry's eldest son, and later King, Prince Edward.

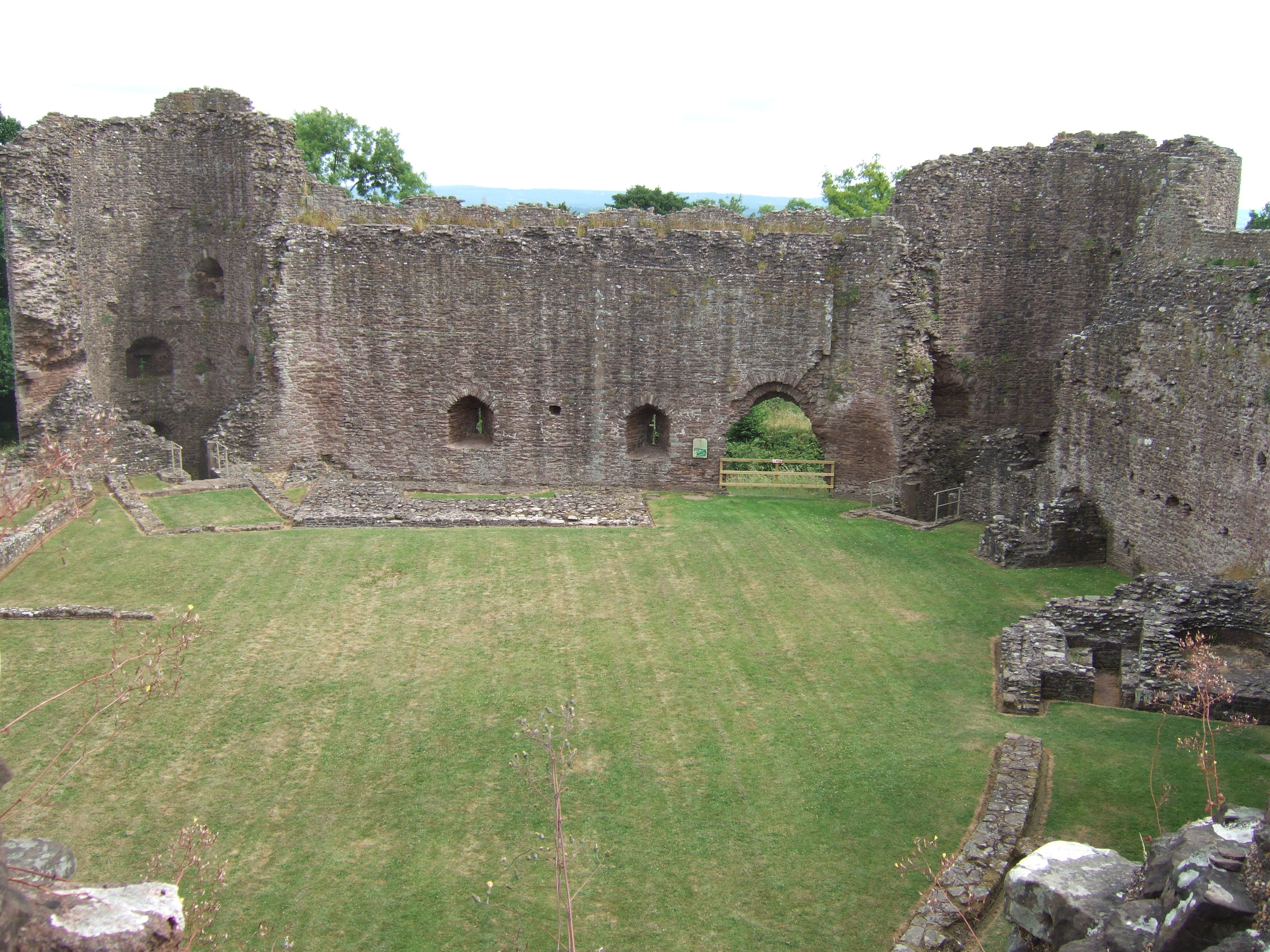
The interior of the inner ward

During the 13th century, the castle was almost entirely rebuilt, although historians have put forward two possible timelines for when this work was carried out. The conventional historical dating places the construction in the 1250s and 1260s, as a single programme of work consisting in the keep being demolished, a new gatehouse and four mural towers constructed and the outer ward reinforced with a stone wall and gatehouse of its own. Paul Remfry argues that the work occurred somewhat earlier during Hubert's tenure, being carried out in two waves between 1229–1231 and 1234–1239. Around this time the fortification is first described in the records as the "White Castle", due to the white rendering applied to its external walls.

The Welsh threat persisted, and in 1262 the castle was readied in response to Prince Llywelyn ap Gruffudd's attack on Abergavenny in 1262; commanded by its constable Gilbert Talbot, Grosmont was ordered to be garrisoned "by every man, and at whatever cost". The threat passed without incident.

Edmund, the Earl of Lancaster and the capitaneus of the royal forces in Wales, was given the Three Castles in 1267 and for many centuries they were held by the earldom, later duchy, of Lancaster. King Edward I's conquest of Wales in 1282 removed much of White Castle's military utility, although it continued to be used in the administration of the surrounding manor, and for mustering military levies. Little further work was carried out on the fortification, although one of the gatehouse towers was repaired at some point, and repairs were carried out to the chapel tower and gatehouse under King Henry VI. By 1538, White Castle had fallen into disuse and then into ruin; a 1613 description noted that it was "ruynous and decayed".

=== 18th–21st centuries ===
In 1825, the Three Castles were sold off to Henry Somerset, the sixth Duke of Beaufort. In 1902, his descendant Henry Somerset, the 9th Duke, sold White Castle to Sir Henry Mather Jackson. Evidence was given to the Royal Commission on Ancient Monuments in Wales and Monmouthshire in 1909, stating that Sir Henry had taken steps to strip the castle of ivy and that it was now in a good condition; the site was apparently looked after by an old woman, who charged visitors for entry. The castle was placed into the care of the state in 1922. In the 21st century, White Castle is managed by the Welsh heritage agency Cadw and is protected under UK law as a grade I listed building.

== Architecture ==
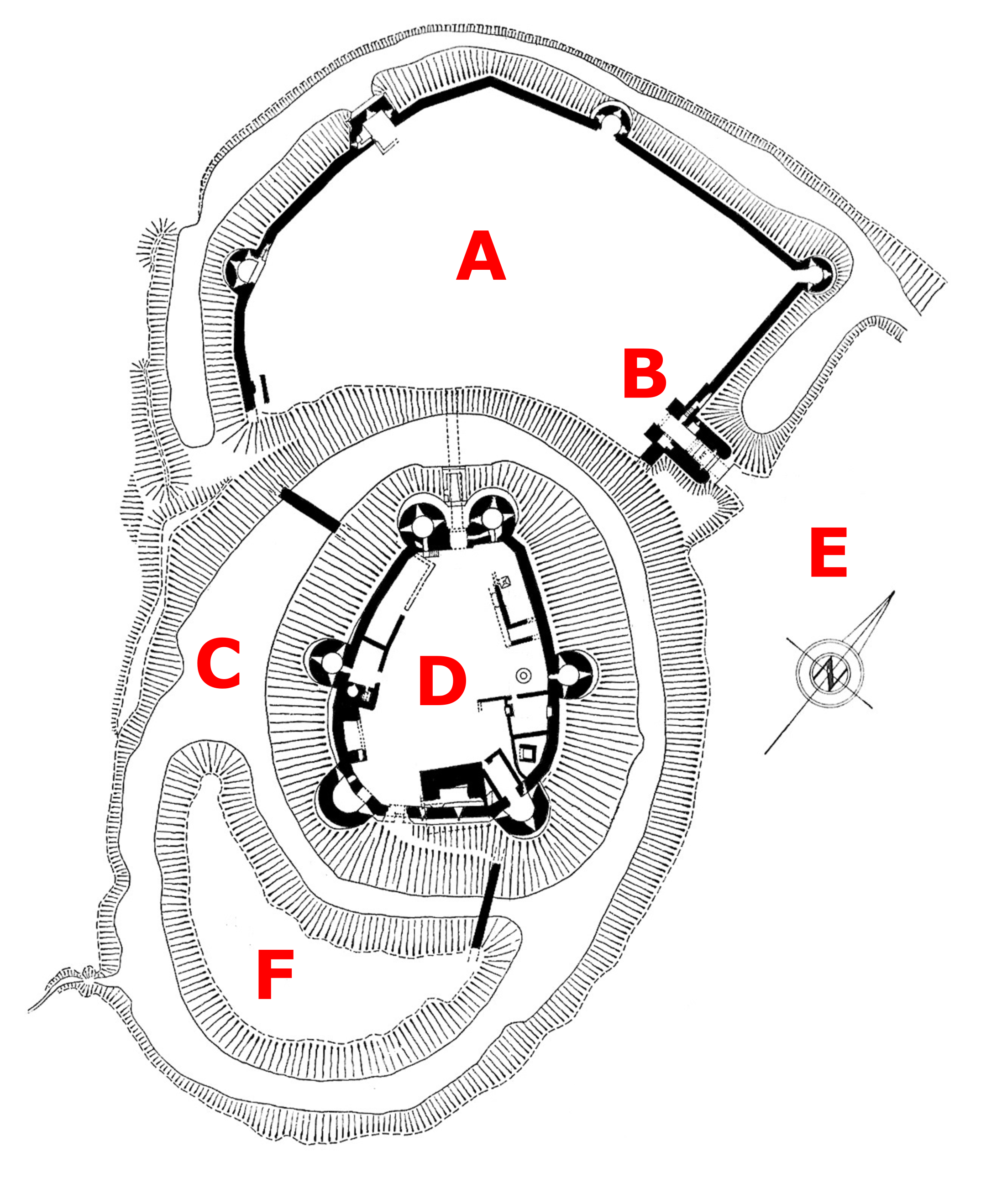
Plan of the castle: A – outer ward; B – outer gatehouse; C – moat; D- inner ward; E – former location of outer enclosure; F – hornwork

White Castle occupies a hill near the village of Llantilio Crossenny, overlooking the surrounding landscape. The castle dates mainly from the 13th century and is made up of a central inner ward, a crescent-shaped hornwork to the south, and an outer ward to the north, with its stonework constructed from red sandstone. The outer ward was originally much larger, extending around the castle further to the east, but only limited traces of these earthworks survive. It is now entered from the north-east although, before the 13th century, the entrance was originally on the south side. The historian Paul Remfry considers the castle to be "a masterpiece of military engineering" for the period.

The outer ward is 320 by 170 feet (98 by 52 m) across, accessed by a gatehouse on the eastern edge and defended by a stone curtain wall, a dry ditch and four mural towers. The gatehouse, which survives up to 5 metres (16 ft) in height, originally had a portcullis and a drawbridge. Three of the towers were circular in design, but one was rectangular and would have been used as lodgings for a household official. There was a large building, probably a barn, 115 by 66 feet (35 by 20 m) across, on the north-western edge of the ward, alongside a group of smaller buildings, but all have since been lost.

The inner ward is approximately 150 by 110 feet (46 by 34 m) across, protected by a deep, revetted, water-filled moat, dug out of the rock. The curtain wall has four circular, four-storey towers and a gatehouse, with domestic buildings reaching around the insides of the defences. The four-storey gatehouse is flanked by two circular towers and would originally have had a portcullis and a drawbridge. It would originally have been used by the castle's constable or steward. Stretching eastwards from the gatehouse are the castle's hall, the constable's living quarters, the chapel – partially contained in one of the towers- the remains of the earlier keep, service buildings and the kitchen block. Only the foundations of these buildings survive. A postern gate in the inner ward leads through to the southern hornwork, which would originally have been linked by a wooden bridge, protected by timber defences and towers, with later stone additions, of which only traces remain.

White Castle has unusual arrow loops, with the two arms of a conventional cross-shaped loop offset vertically, so that one side is higher than the other. Historians have contrasting views of the effectiveness of this design; they might have been a sensible way to ensure that the defenders could shoot down the slopes around the castle, or to give better protection from incoming shot, although tests in 1980 showed them to have been extremely vulnerable to incoming shots.

== See also ==
- Castles in Great Britain and Ireland
- List of castles in Wales
- Three Castles walk

== Bibliography ==
- Davies, R. R. (2006) [1990]. Domination and Conquest: The Experience of Ireland, Scotland and Wales, 1100–1300. Cambridge, UK: Cambridge University Press. ISBN 978-0-52102-977-3.
- Goodall, John (2011). The English Castle, 1066–1650. New Haven, US and London, UK: Yale University Press. ISBN 978-0-30011-058-6.
- Holden, Brock W. (2008). Lords of the Central Marches: English Aristocracy and Frontier Society, 1087–1265. Oxford, UK: Oxford University Press. ISBN 978-0-19-954857-6.
- King, D. J. Cathcart (1991). The Castle in England and Wales: An Interpretative History. London, UK: Routledge. ISBN 9780415003506.
- Knight, Jeremy K. (2009) [1991]. The Three Castles: Grosmont Castle, Skenfrith Castle, White Castle (revised ed.). Cardiff, UK: Cadw. ISBN 978-1-85760-266-1.
- Liddiard, Robert (2005). Castles in Context: Power, Symbolism and Landscape, 1066 to 1500. Macclesfield, UK: Windgather Press. ISBN 0-9545575-2-2.
- Pounds, Norman John Greville (1994). The Medieval Castle in England and Wales: A Social and Political History. Cambridge, UK: Cambridge University Press. ISBN 978-0-521-45828-3.
- Radford, C. A. Ralegh (1962). White Castle, Monmouthshire. London, UK: Her Majesty's Stationery Office. OCLC 30258313.
- Remfry, Paul (2010–2011). "White Castle and the Dating of the Towers" (PDF). The Castle Studies Group Journal (24): 213–226.
- Royal Commission on Ancient Monuments in Wales and Monmouthshire (1912). Minutes of Evidence Given Before the Royal Commission on Ancient Monuments in Wales and Monmouthshire. London, UK: His Majesty's Stationery Office. OCLC 757802640.
- Taylor, A. J. (1961). "White Castle in the Thirteenth Century: A Re-Consideration". Medieval Archaeology. 5: 169–175. doi:10.1080/00766097.1961.11735651.
