= Grosmont Castle =

Castle ruins in Monmouthshire, Wales

- Grosmont, Monmouthshire, Wales
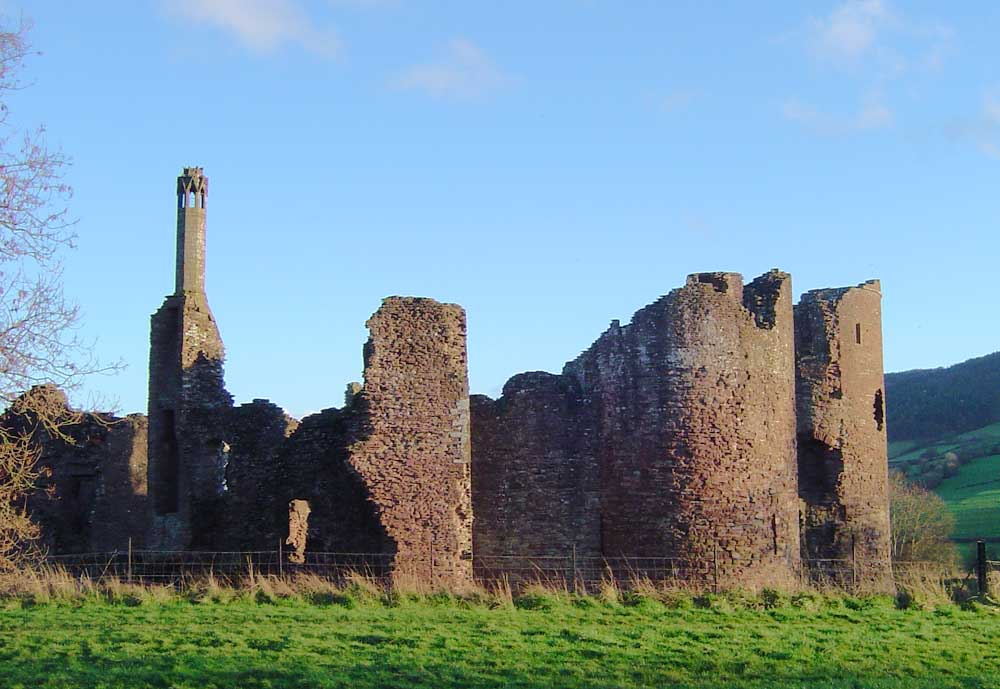
- Grosmont Castle, seen from the north-west

Site information
- Type: Castle
- Controlled by: Cadw
- Open to the public: Yes
- Condition: Ruined

Location
- Shown within Monmouthshire
- Location within Monmouthshire
- Coordinates: 51.915278°N 2.865833°W

Site history
- Materials: Old Red Sandstone
- Events: Norman invasion of Wales; Glyndŵr Rising

Listed Building – Grade I
- Reference no.: 1949

Scheduled monument
- Reference no.: MM007

Grosmont Castle is a ruined castle in the village of Grosmont, Monmouthshire, Wales. The fortification was established by the Normans in the wake of the invasion of England in 1066, to protect the route from Wales to Hereford. Possibly commissioned by William FitzOsbern, 1st Earl of Hereford, it was originally an earthwork design with timber defences. In 1135, a major Welsh revolt took place, and in response King Stephen brought together Grosmont Castle and its sister fortifications of Skenfrith and White Castle to form a lordship known as the "Three Castles", which continued to play a role in defending the region from Welsh attack for several centuries.

King John gave the castle to a powerful royal official, Hubert de Burgh, in 1201. During the course of the next few decades it passed back and forth between several owners, including Hubert, the rival De Braose family, and the Crown. Hubert rebuilt the castle in stone, beginning with a new hall and then, on regaining the property in 1219, adding a curtain wall, gatehouse and mural towers. In 1233, a royal army camped outside the castle was attacked by rebel forces under the command of Richard Marshal. Edmund, the Earl of Lancaster, gained possession of the castle in 1267, and it remained in the hands of the earldom and later Duchy of Lancaster until 1825.

Edward I's conquest of Wales in 1282 removed much of Grosmont Castle's military utility, although it was besieged in 1405 during the Glyndŵr Rising. By the 16th century it had fallen into disuse and ruin. The castle was placed into the care of the state in 1922, and is now managed by the Cadw Welsh heritage agency.

== History ==
=== 11th–12th centuries ===
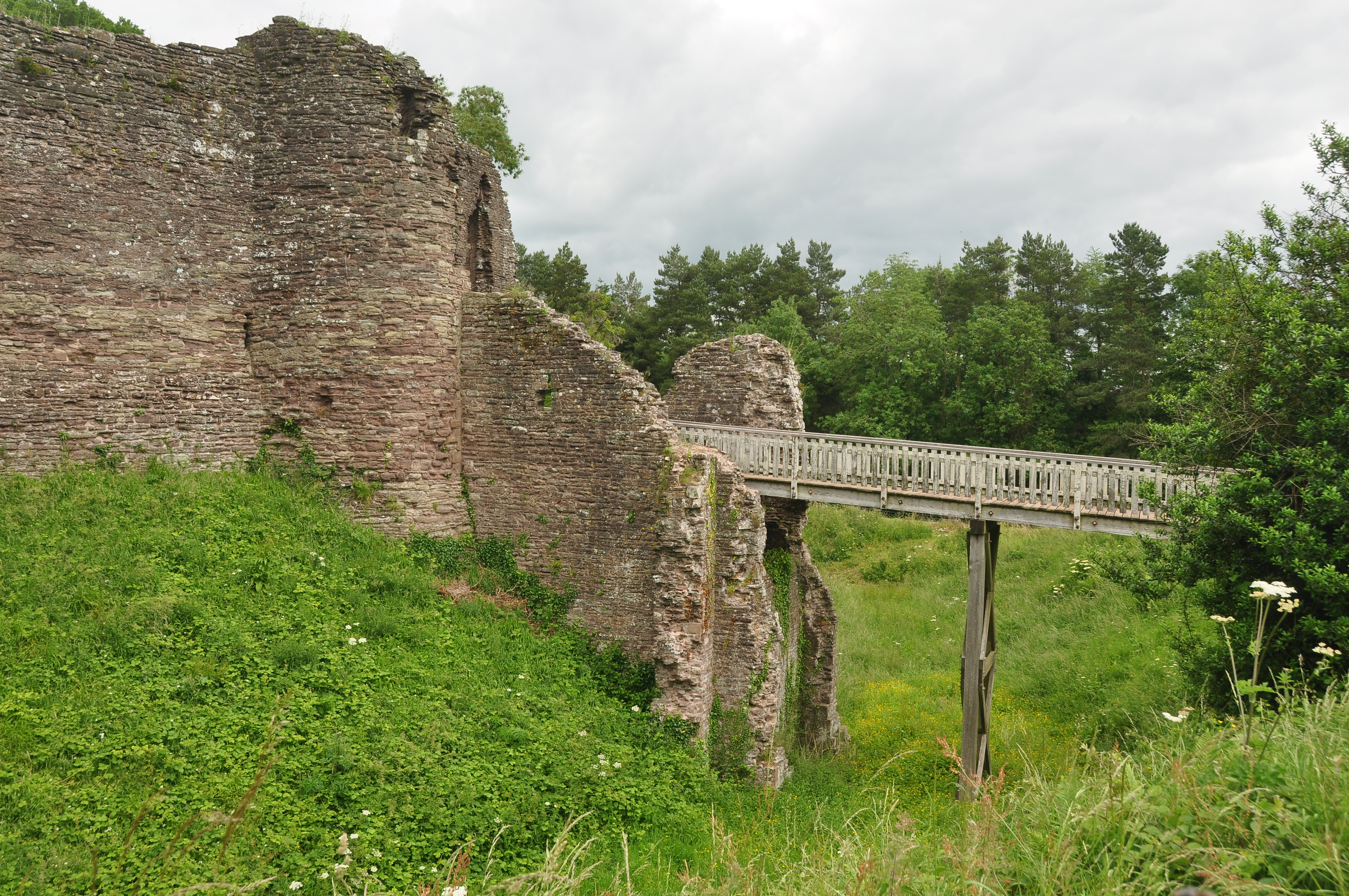
Ditch, modern bridge and ruined gatehouse

Grosmont Castle was built following the Norman Conquest of England in 1066. Shortly after the invasion, the Normans pushed up into the Welsh Marches, and William the Conqueror made William FitzOsbern, 1st Earl of Hereford. The new Earl then added to his estate by capturing the towns of Monmouth and Chepstow. The Normans used castles extensively to subdue the Welsh, establish new settlements and exert their claims of lordship over the territories.

Grosmont was one of three fortifications built in the Monnow valley around this time to protect the route from Wales to Hereford, possibly by the earl himself. The first castle on the site was built from earth and timber, with a keep and a motte protected by a palisade and a ditch. The Normans established a borough alongside the castle, which later became the village of Grosmont.

The earl's landholdings in the region were slowly broken up after William fitz Osbern's son, Roger de Breteuil, rebelled against the Crown in 1075. By the early 12th century, Grosmont was owned by the Anglo-Norman nobleman Pain fitzJohn. In 1135, a major Welsh revolt took place, and in response King Stephen restructured the landholdings along this section of the Marches, bringing Grosmont Castle and its sister fortifications of Skenfrith and White Castle back under the control of the Crown to form a lordship known as the "Three Castles".

Conflict with the Welsh continued, and following a period of détente under Henry II in the 1160s, the De Braose and De Mortimer Marcher families attacked their Welsh rivals during the 1170s, leading to a Welsh assault on nearby Abergavenny Castle in 1182. In response, the Crown readied Grosmont to face a potential Welsh attack. Over the next three years, £15 was spent on the castle under the supervision of Ralph of Grosmont, a royal official, probably for works on the timber fortifications. (Note: Comparison of medieval financial figures with modern equivalents is notoriously challenging. For comparison, the average annual income of a baron during this period was around £200.)

=== 13th–17th centuries ===
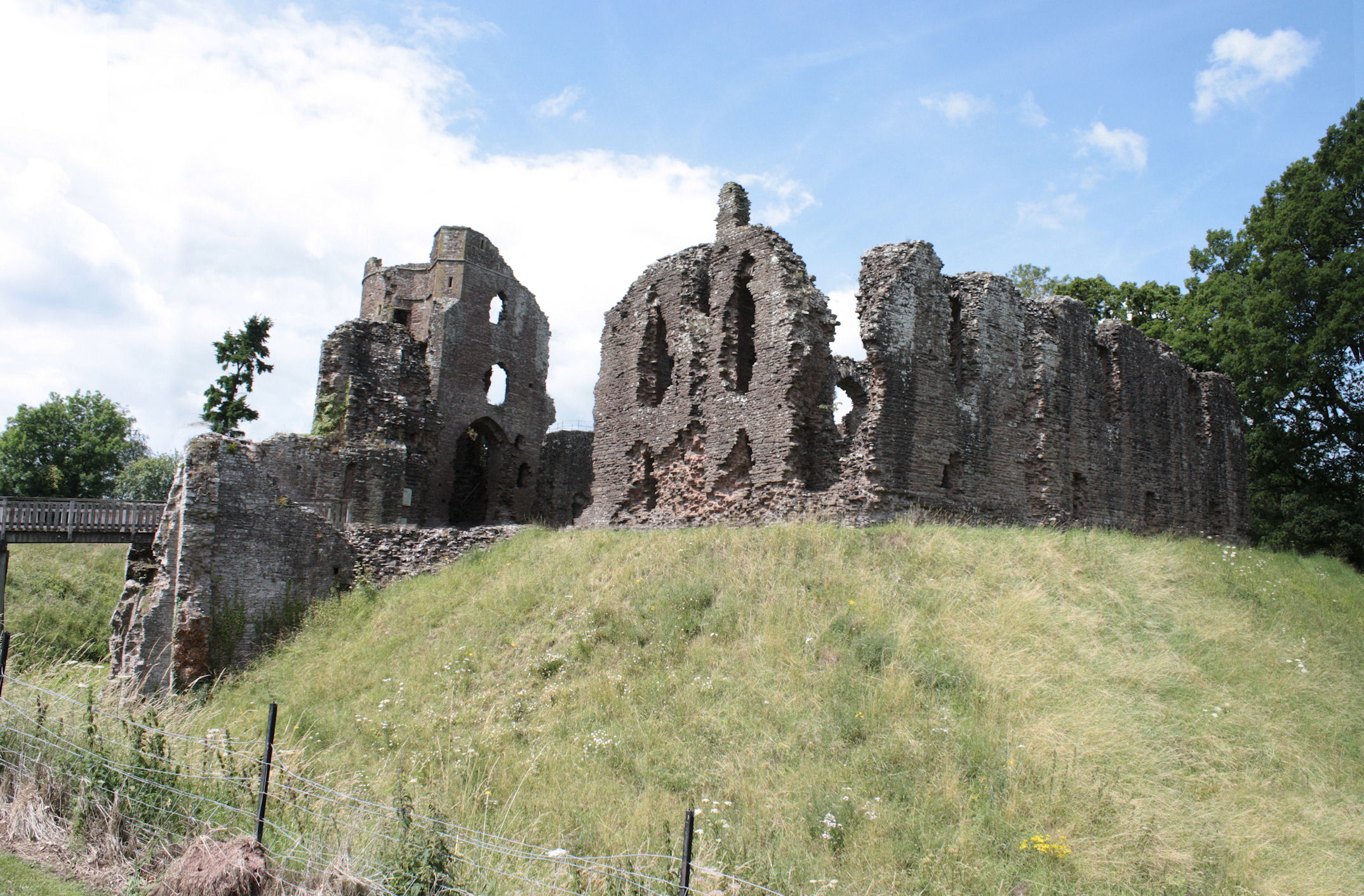
The hall, seen from the south-east

In 1201, King John gave the "Three Castles" title to Hubert de Burgh. Hubert was a minor landowner who had become King John's household chamberlain while still a prince, and went on to become an increasingly powerful royal official once King John inherited the throne. Hubert began to upgrade his new castles, starting with Grosmont, where he rebuilt the hall block in stone. Hubert was captured fighting the French in 1205 and, while he was imprisoned, King John took back the castles and gave them to William de Braose, one of Hubert's rivals. King John subsequently fell out with William and dispossessed him of his lands in 1207, but De Braose's son, also called William, took the opportunity of the chaos during the First Barons' War to retake the castles.

Once released from captivity, Hubert regained his grip on power, becoming the royal justiciar and being made the Earl of Kent, before finally recovering the Three Castles in 1219 during the reign of Henry III. He resumed his work at Grosmont, rebuilding the timber walls in stone and adding three mural towers and a gatehouse to its defences. The result was secure, high-status accommodation. Hubert fell from power in 1232 and was stripped of the castles, which were placed under the command of Walerund Teutonicus, a royal servant. King Henry led an army into Wales in 1233 against the rebellious Richard Marshal, the Earl of Pembroke, and his Welsh allies, and camped outside Grosmont Castle that November. Richard carried out a night attack on their encampment and, while not taking the castle itself, forced the rest of the King's army to flee in confusion.

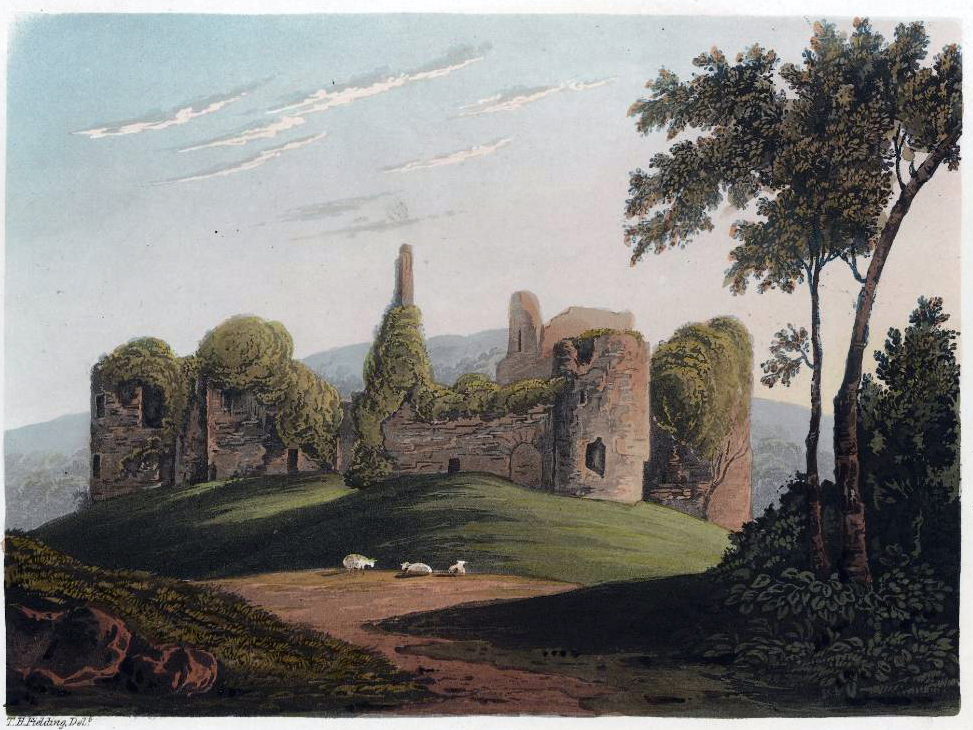
Depiction of the castle in 1823, by Theodore Fielding

Hubert was reconciled with the King in 1234 and the castles were returned to him, only for him to fall out with King Henry III again in 1239: Grosmont was taken back and put under the command of Walerund. Walerund completed some of Hubert's work, including building a new chapel. In 1254, Grosmont Castle and her sister fortifications were granted to King Henry's eldest son and later king, Edward. The Welsh threat persisted, and in 1262 the castle was readied in response to Prince Llywelyn ap Gruffudd's attack on Abergavenny in 1262; commanded by its constable Gilbert Talbot, Grosmont was ordered to be garrisoned "by every man, and at whatever cost". The threat passed without incident.

Edmund, the Earl of Lancaster and the capitaneus of the royal forces in Wales, was given the Three Castles in 1267 and for many centuries they were held by the earldom, and later duchy, of Lancaster. King Edward I's conquest of Wales in 1282 removed much of Grosmont's military utility, but, under either Henry of Lancaster or his son Henry of Grosmont, the interior of the castle was modernised in the first half of the 14th century to create a suite of high quality apartments. A deer park was maintained around the castle. The historian Jeremy Knight describes the castle at this time as forming "a small but very comfortable residence".

The castle's final military role was during the revolt of Owain Glyndŵr at the start of the 15th century. There was a battle between the Welsh and Richard Beauchamp, 13th Earl of Warwick near Grosmont in 1404, leading to an English victory. The castle was besieged the next year by Owain's son, Gruffudd, but the castle was relieved by an English force sent by Prince Henry. By 1538, Grosmont Castle had fallen into disuse and then into ruin; a 1563 survey notes that its bridge had collapsed and that, although the outer walls were intact, the interior was in decay and its building materials inside had either been removed or were rotten. A 1613 description noted that it was "ruynous and decayed".

=== 18th–21st centuries ===
In 1825, the Three Castles estates were sold off to Henry Somerset, the 6th Duke of Beaufort. In 1902, Henry Somerset, the 9th Duke, sold Grosmont Castle to Sir Joseph Bradney, a soldier and local historian. Evidence was given to the Royal Commission on Ancient Monuments in Wales and Monmouthshire in 1909, stating that Grosmont was exceptionally well looked after. The castle was placed into the care of the state in 1922 by Frances Lucas-Scudamore, and conservation work was carried out, including clearing the basement of the north block of debris. In the 21st century, Grosmont Castle is managed by the Welsh heritage organisation Cadw and is protected under UK law as a grade I listed building.

== Architecture ==
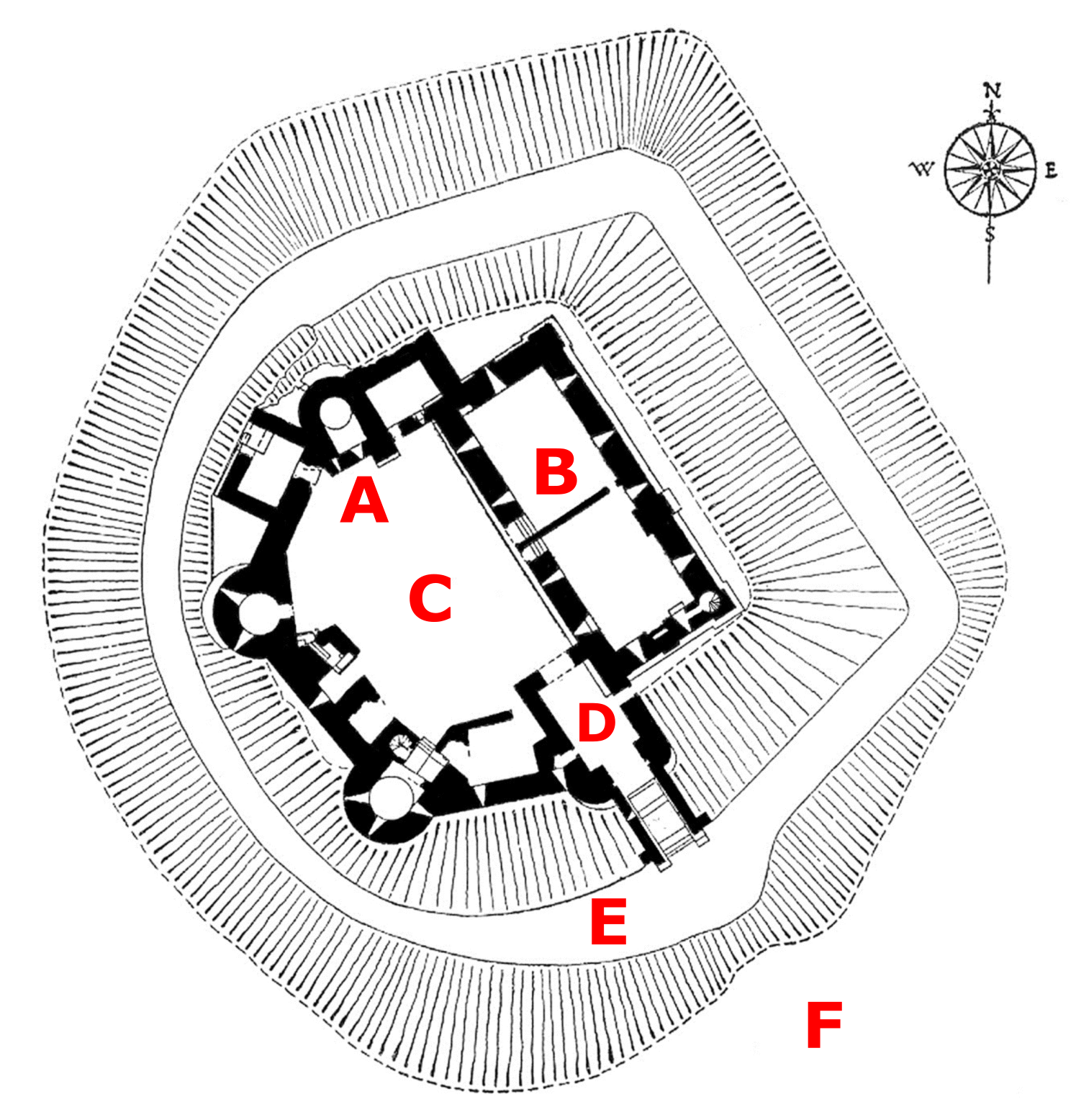
Plan of the castle: A – north block; B – hall block; C – inner ward; D – gatehouse; E – ditch; F – site of outer bailey

Grosmont Castle overlooks the village of the same name, and in its current form dates mostly from the work carried out by Hubert de Burgh with later 14th-century additions. It originally comprised an inner and an outer ward, but the latter has been encroached upon by local gardens. The outer ward would have held a rectangular storehouse or stable. The inner ward forms a stone castle with a gatehouse, two circular mural towers, a hall and a north accommodation block, the whole being protected by a ditch. Originally other timber buildings would have been raised against the outer stone wall as accommodation for the castle's servants, but only limited traces of these survive.

The gatehouse was originally a two-storey, rectangular tower with 14th-century additions, including a buttressed drawbridge pit, but only limited parts of it now survive. The south-west tower was converted into a three-storey suite of rooms in the 14th century; its basement was filled in. The three-storey west tower was also altered during the 14th century, and the basement filled in. The north block is primarily a 14th-century addition to the castle, built over the remains of one of the circular towers and the old postern gate. It comprises three distinct buildings, the largest being a three-storey residential tower. The block has a distinctive octagonal chimney with a carved top.

The hall block is a pilaster-buttressed, two-storey building, 96 by 32 feet (29.3 by 9.8 m) across, with the floors originally linked by a spiral staircase. The first floor of the block contained the hall and a solar room separated by a wooden divide; the hall had a fireplace in the middle of its exterior wall, with two large windows on either side. The ground floor had two service rooms lit by narrow loop windows. An external wooden staircase would have led up directly into the main hall from the inner ward. The block would have closely resembled De Burgh's hall at Christchurch Castle in Dorset.

=== Interior of castle ===
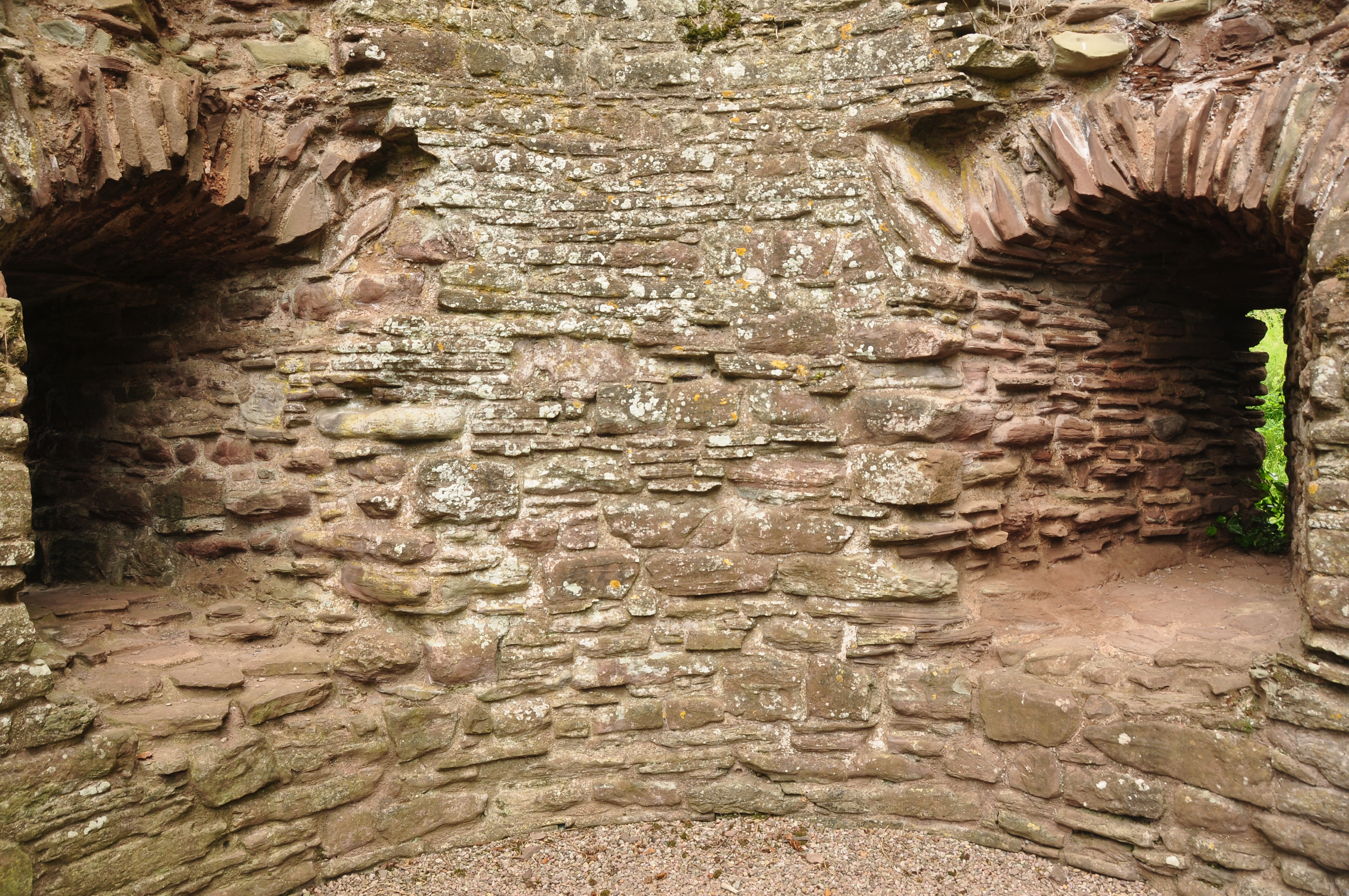
Interior of west tower;

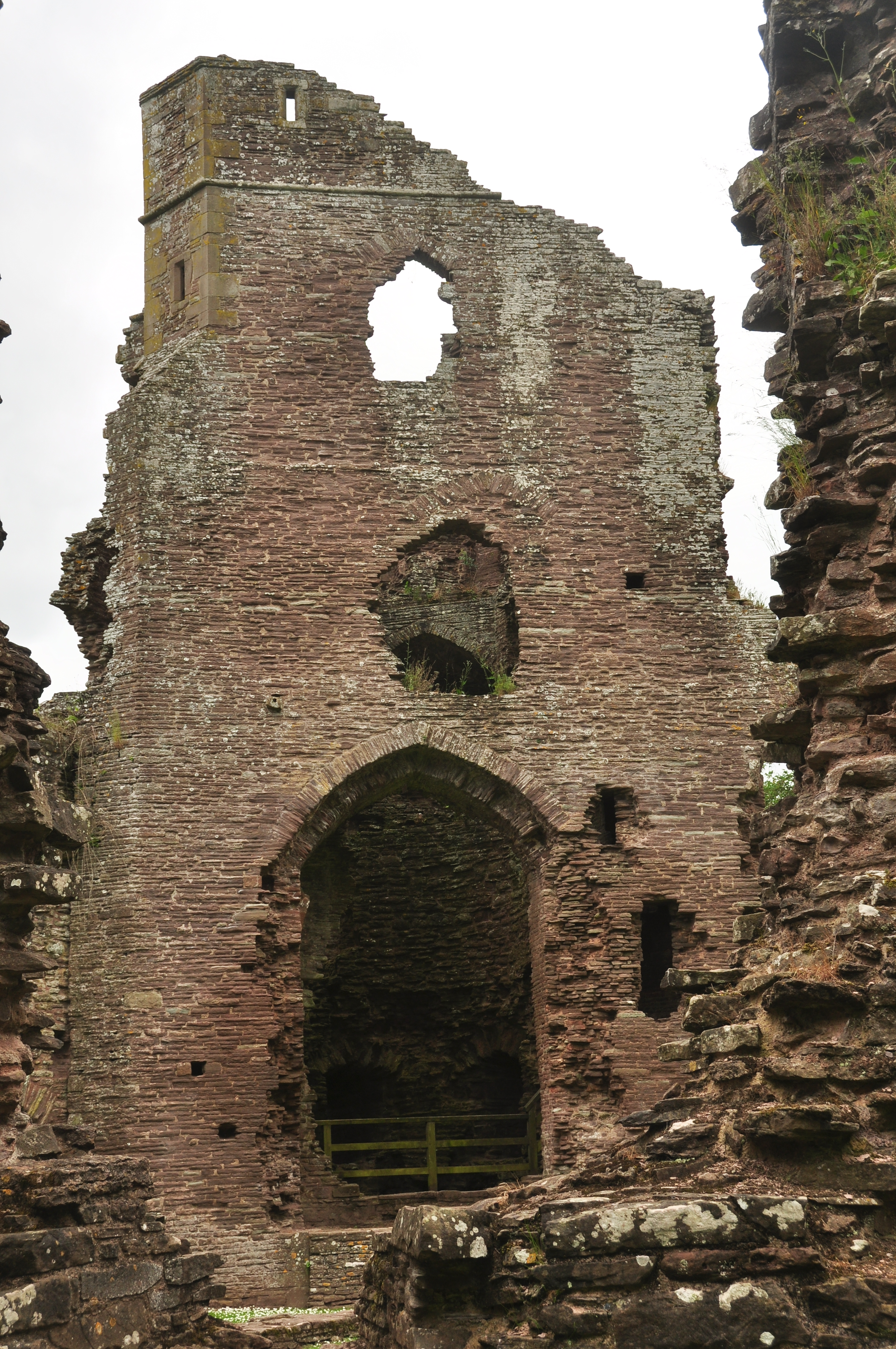
entrance to south-west tower...

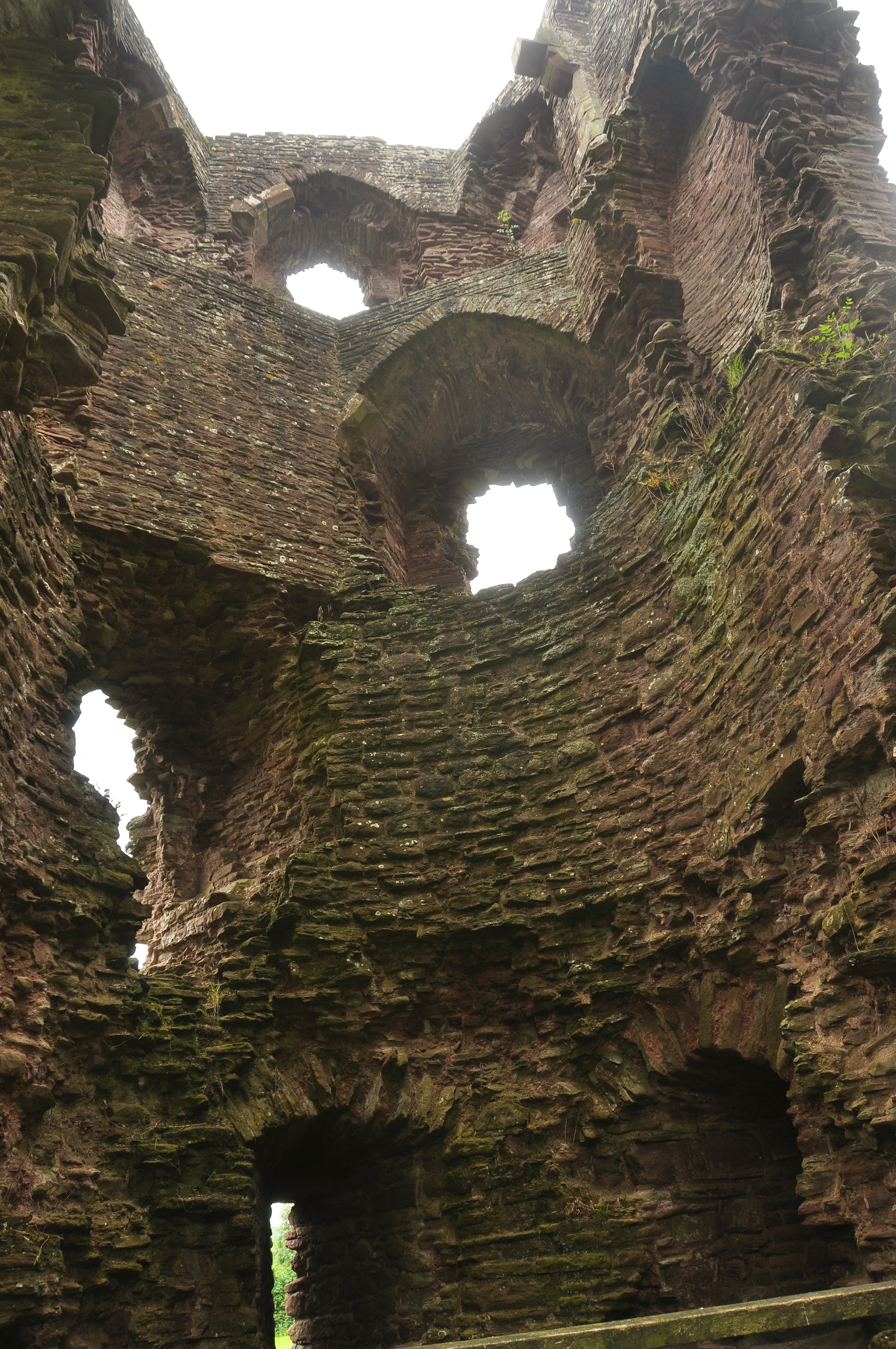
...and interior;

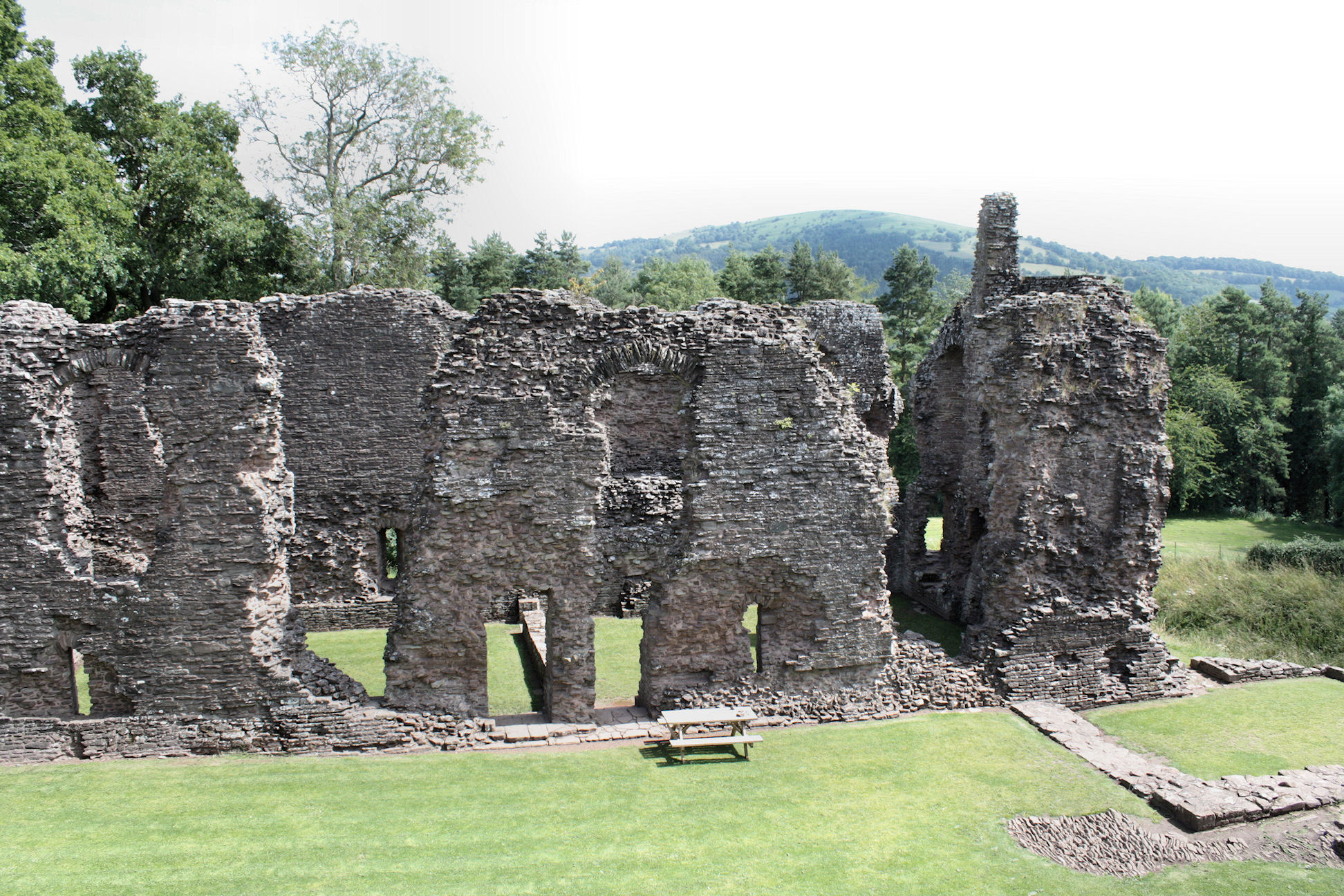
hall range;

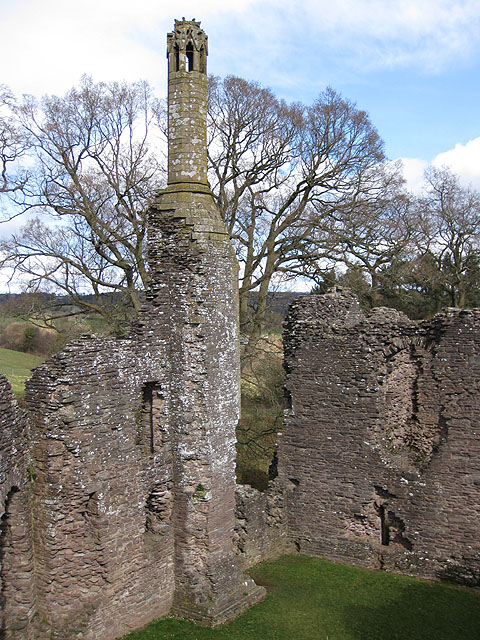
14th-century chimney in the north block.

== See also ==
- Castles in Great Britain and Ireland
- List of castles in Wales
- Three Castles Walk

== Bibliography ==
- Davies, R. R. (2006) [1990]. Domination and Conquest: The Experience of Ireland, Scotland and Wales, 1100–1300. Cambridge, UK: Cambridge University Press. ISBN 978-0-52102-977-3.
- Holden, Brock W. (2008). Lords of the Central Marches: English Aristocracy and Frontier Society, 1087–1265. Oxford, UK: Oxford University Press. ISBN 978-0-19-954857-6.
- Knight, Jeremy K. (2009) [1991]. The Three Castles: Grosmont Castle, Skenfrith Castle, White Castle (revised ed.). Cardiff, UK: Cadw. ISBN 978-1-85760-266-1.
- Pounds, Norman John Greville (1994). The Medieval Castle in England and Wales: A Social and Political History. Cambridge, UK: Cambridge University Press. ISBN 978-0-521-45828-3.
- Radford, C. A. Ralegh (1958) [1946]. Grosmont, Monmouthshire. London, UK: Her Majesty's Stationery Office. OCLC 43056508.
- Radford, C. A. Ralegh (1962). White Castle, Monmouthshire. London, UK: Her Majesty's Stationery Office. OCLC 30258313.
- Royal Commission on Ancient Monuments in Wales and Monmouthshire (1912). Minutes of Evidence Given Before the Royal Commission on Ancient Monuments in Wales and Monmouthshire. London, UK: His Majesty's Stationery Office. OCLC 757802640.
- Taylor, A. J. (1961). "White Castle in the Thirteenth Century: A Re-Consideration". Medieval Archaeology. 5: 169–175.
