= John de Braose =

Welsh noble (died 1232)

- Lord of Bramber, Lord of Gower
- Born: 1197 or 1198
- Died: 18 July 1232; Bramber, Sussex, England
- Noble family: House of Braose
- Issue: William de Braose, 1st Baron Braose
- Father: William de Braose
- Mother: Maud de Clare

Arms of John's grandson, William de Braose, 2nd Baron Braose (1260–1326) as blazoned in the Falkirk Roll of Arms, c.1298, which gives the tail as doubled: Azure crusilly (i.e. semy) of crosses crosslet and a lion double queued rampant or

John de Braose (1197 or 1198 – 18 July 1232), known as Tadody to the Welsh, was the Lord of Bramber and Gower.

== Re-establishment of the de Braose dynasty ==
John re-established the senior branch of the de Braose dynasty.

His father was William de Braose, eldest son of William de Braose, 4th Lord of Bramber and Maud de St. Valery, and his mother was Maud de Clare, (born c. 1184) daughter of Richard de Clare, 3rd Earl of Hertford of Tonbridge Castle in Kent. John was their eldest son and one of four brothers, the others being Giles, Phillip and Walter de Braose.

== Royal threat ==
His grandfather had had his lands seized and his grandmother Maud de St. Valery had been captured by forces of King John of England in 1210. She was imprisoned, along with John's father William, in Corfe Castle and walled alive inside the dungeon. Both mother and son starved to death on the King's orders. This was probably due to John's grandfather's conflict with the monarch, open rebellion and subsequent alliance with Llewelyn the Great. John's nickname Tadody means "fatherless" in the Welsh.

== Hiding and imprisonment ==
At his family's fall from Royal favour John de Braose was initially hidden on Gower and spent some time in the care of his uncle Giles de Braose, Bishop of Hereford, but finally in 1214 John and his younger brother Philip were taken into custody. They were imprisoned until after King John had died (in 1216), the throne passing to Henry III. John was released from custody in 1218.

== Welsh intermarriage ==
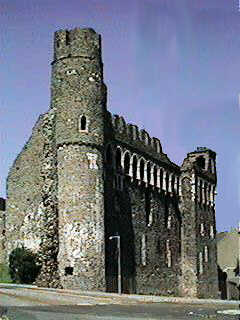
Swansea castle, the centre of power for the honour of Gower

In 1219 he married Margaret ferch Llywelyn (born about 1202 in the Kingdom of Gwynedd), daughter of the leader of Wales, Llywelyn Fawr. He received the Lordship of Gower as her dowry with Llywelyn's blessing.

In 1226 another surviving uncle Reginald de Braose sold him the honour of Bramber, and he inherited more lands and titles when this uncle died a few years later in 1228. Sometime in the 1220s, he established the deer park, Parc le Breos in the Gower Peninsula.

He and Margaret, his Welsh wife, had three sons, his heir, William de Braose the eldest son, John and Richard (born about 1225 in Stinton, Norfolk) the youngest (buried in Woodbridge Priory, Suffolk, having died before June 1292).

== Death and legacy ==
In 1232 John was killed in a fall from his horse on his land in Bramber, Sussex at 34 years of age. His widow soon remarried to Walter III de Clifford. William de Braose (born about 1224; died 1291 in Findon, Sussex), his eldest son, succeeded him in the title of Lord of Bramber. John the younger son became Lord of the manor of Corsham in Wiltshire and also later Lord of Glasbury on Wye.

William de Braose (c. 1224–1291) also had a son named William de Braose who died "shortly before 1st May 1326".

Another William de Braose, who became Bishop of Llandaff, cannot be placed with certainty in this branch of the family.

The de Braose name was modified to de Brewes in the Middle Ages, 1200 to 1400.

== See also ==
- House of Braose
