= Loretta de Braose, Countess of Leicester =

English noblewoman

Loretta de Braose or de Briouze (died 4 March 1266/7) was by marriage the Countess of Leicester from 1196 until 1204, For a period in the years 1209–1214, she was in exile. She took a vow of celibacy in 1214 and became an anchoress in 1221. She maintained contact with the outside world through written correspondence for the rest of her life.

== Family and marriage ==
Born around 1185, Loretta was one of at least five daughters and four sons who survived to adulthood of William de Braose, lord of Bramber in Sussex and Radnor, Abergavenny and Brecon in Wales (d. 1211) and his wife, Maud de St. Valery.

She married Robert de Beaumont, 4th Earl of Leicester, son and heir of Robert de Beaumont, 3rd Earl of Leicester and Petronilla de Grandmesnil, in or soon after 1196. For many of the later years of their short marriage, Earl Robert was on the continent fighting for King John of England. The couple were either childless or no child survived the earl, whose heirs were thus his two sisters.

== Widowhood and exile ==
When widowed in 1204, Loretta was to receive a dower of 100 pounds' worth of land and the dowry estates she had brought to her marriage. The political circumstances, fierce fighting on the Welsh Marches, and her mother-in-law's claims to certain estates assigned as dower for Loretta all contributed to her financial woes, and she was forced to request a loan from the crown of 100 marcs in 1207.

William de Braose had been one of King John's closest associates, but soon after Countess Loretta was widowed, her father began to rapidly lose favour with the king. Disfavour grew into a vendetta against the de Braose family and associates. King John campaigned against William, his wife Maud, and their son-in-law Walter de Lacy in Ireland. Maud and her eldest son, William, were captured and imprisoned in Windsor Castle. When negotiations failed, the king declared William de Braose an outlaw. John learned of a rumoured plot to depose him and offer the throne to Simon de Montfort, Loretta’s nephew by marriage and a famed crusader against the Cathar heretics in southern France. John reacted by confiscating land, imprisoning suspects and their family members in the years 1209–1211.

Loretta went into exile along with other members of her family, including her brother Giles de Braose, bishop of Hereford. Her mother and eldest brother were starved to death in captivity at Corfe Castle; her sister Annora was held until 1214; her maternal uncle and four young nephews were also held for years. Loretta's lands were confiscated.

== Life as an anchoress ==
Loretta returned to England sometime between her father's death in 1211 and her official declaration that she had remained single, issued in December 1214. Her lands were restored to her, and she held them at least four years. In 1221, she had become a recluse or anchoress at Hackington, just north of Canterbury in Kent. Archbishop Stephen Langton approved all the arrangements for her seclusion. She lived there for at least forty-five years. Loretta also championed the new Franciscans in England through her network of contacts with influential individuals, despite her status as a recluse. She had a manservant and two maidservants, the former perhaps serving as a letter carrier.

In 1265 Simon de Montfort, earl of Leicester, Loretta's great-nephew by marriage, held King Henry III captive as a result of a successful baronial rebellion. The earl wrote to "the recluse of Hackington" in the king's name for information regarding the rights and liberties of the stewardship of England, customarily held by the earls of Leicester, three months before his death at the Battle of Evesham in August 1265.

Loretta died on 4 March 1266 or 1267.

== Sources ==
- Johns, Susan M. (2004), Briouze, Loretta de, countess of Leicester (d. in or after 1266), Oxford Dictionary of National Biography, Oxford University Press (subscription, Wikipedia Library access or UK public library membership required)
- Pearson, Hilary E. (2026). "Loretta de Briouze". In Michelle M. Sauer; Diane Watt; Liz Herbert McAvoy (eds.). The Palgrave Encyclopedia of Medieval Women's Writing in the Global Middle Ages. Palgrave Macmillan. pp. 561–562.
- Powicke, F. M. "Loretta, Countess of Leicester", Historical Essays in Honour of James Tait, ed. J. G. Edwards et al. (Manchester: 1933), pp. 247–274.
