= William Cragh =

13th-century Welsh rebel who survived being hanged

William Cragh (Note: Other names include William the Scabby (cragh means "scabby" in Welsh), or William ap Rhys.) (c. 1262 – after 1307) was a medieval Welsh warrior and supporter of Rhys ap Maredudd, lord of the lands of Ystrad Tywi, in his rebellion against King Edward I of England. Captured in 1290 by the son of William de Briouze, the Cambro-Norman Lord of Gower, he was tried and found guilty of having killed thirteen men. Cragh was hanged just outside Swansea within sight of de Briouze's Swansea Castle, twice, as the gallows collapsed during his first hanging. Lady Mary de Briouze interceded on Cragh's behalf and prayed to the deceased Bishop of Hereford, Thomas de Cantilupe, requesting him to ask God to bring Cragh back from the dead. Cragh began to show signs of life the day after his execution and over the subsequent few weeks made a full recovery, living at least another eighteen years.

The main primary source for Cragh's story is the record of the investigation into the canonisation of Thomas de Cantilupe, which is held in the Vatican Library. Cragh's resurrection was one of thirty-eight miracles presented to the papal commissioners who in 1307 were charged with examining the evidence for Cantilupe's saintliness. The hanged man himself gave evidence to the commission, after which nothing more is known of him. Cantilupe was formally canonised by Pope John XXII on 17 April 1320.

== Background ==
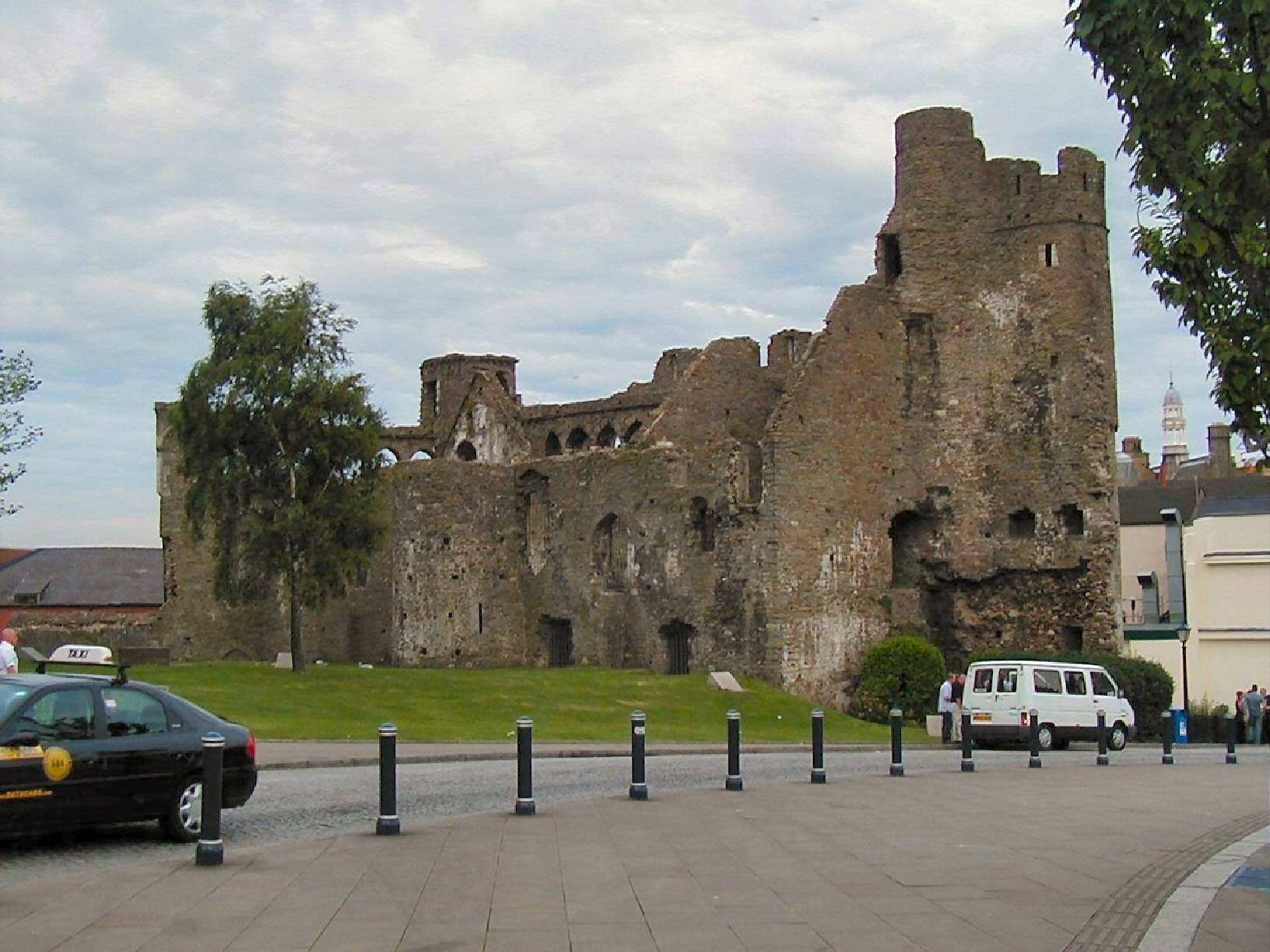
Swansea Castle, home of the de Briouze family, where Cragh was held before his execution

William Cragh was born in about 1262 in the Welsh parish of Llanrhidian, Gower, to Rhys ap Gwilym and his wife Swanith. In 1282 and 1283 King Edward I of England waged a military campaign in Wales that ended with his annexation of the country. One of Edward's allies, Rhys ap Maredudd, found the post-war settlement unsatisfactory and launched a rebellion against the king in 1287. Edward's vastly superior forces soon crushed the uprising, but Rhys ap Maredudd remained at liberty until his capture and execution in 1292. Cragh probably took part in the rebellion on the Welsh side. He was apprehended in 1290 by the son of William de Briouze, the Lord of Gower, who was defending his father's lands against incursions by the rebels still at large. Cragh was one of fourteen prisoners captured by de Briouze, twelve of whom were subsequently released. Cragh was taken to Swansea Castle, where he was held in the dungeons awaiting trial, accused of killing 13 men.

The law in Wales at the time permitted condemned men to atone for their crimes by making a payment to their victims. Cragh's friends and family rallied round to offer a hundred cows to de Briouze for his release, but the offer was refused. The substantial scale of the proposed compensation indicates that Cragh was an important man, although some witnesses described him as a thief rather than a rebel. Historian Jussi Hanska has suggested that de Briouze's refusal to accept the offer strengthens the case for Cragh being a rebel, as there is no other convincing reason to explain why he should have opted to "decline good income just to hang a thief".

Cragh pleaded innocence of the charges against him, but he was found guilty and sentenced to be hanged.

== Execution ==
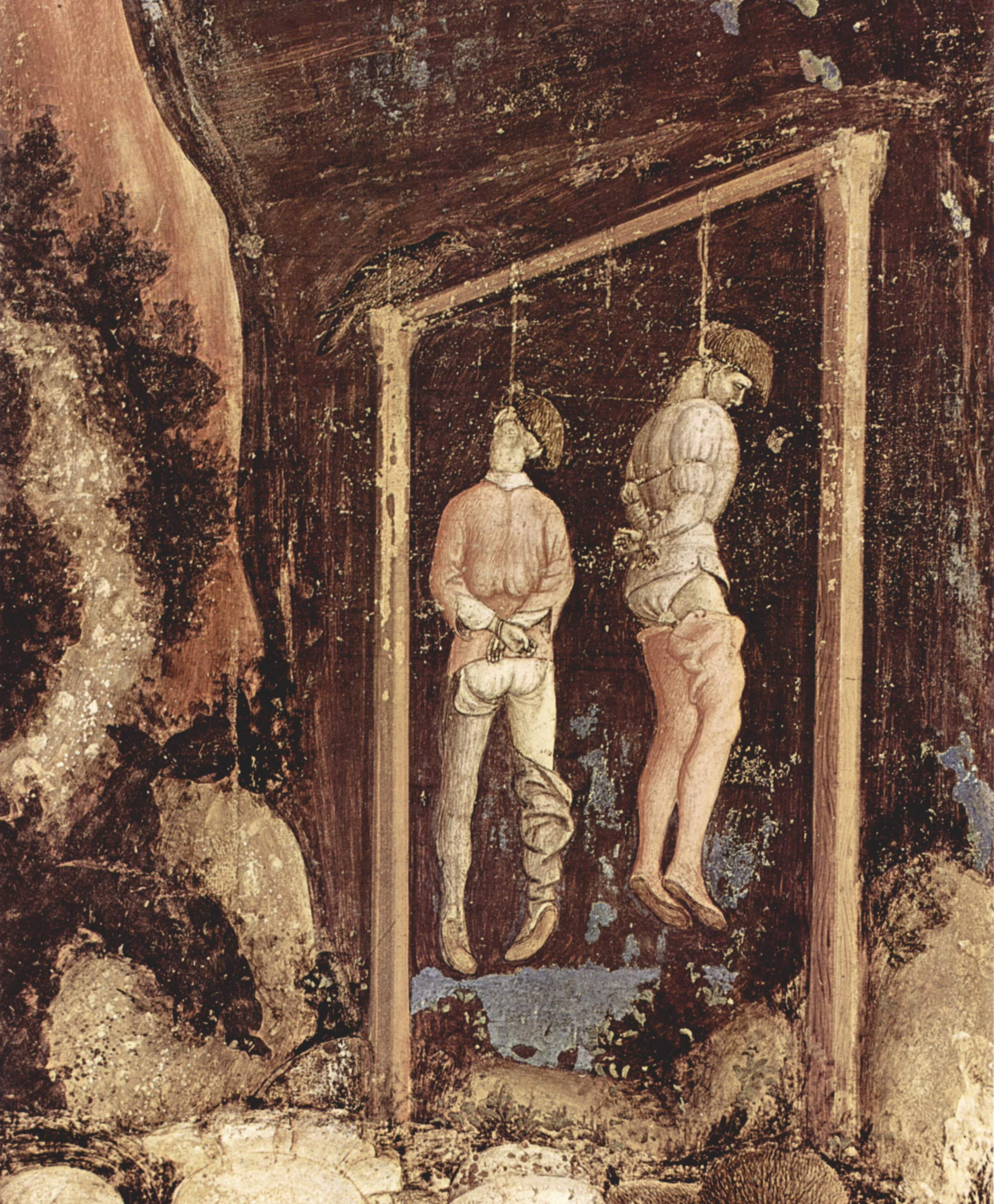
The type of gallows on which William Cragh was hanged with Trahaern ap Hywel in 1290, from a fresco painted by Pisanello, 1436–1438

Cragh was hanged on a hill about a quarter mile (400 metres) outside Swansea, in sight of de Briouze's Swansea Castle, on Monday, 27 November 1290. (Note: Historian Jussi Hanska gives the date as 12 November 1291, but a contemporary account written by the canons of Hereford says the de Briouze party, which included William Cragh, ended their pilgrimage to Cantilupe's shrine on 2 December 1290.) He was executed along with another "malefactor", Trahaern ap Hywel. Although the latter was dealt with by the town executioner, Cragh was hanged by one of his own relatives, Ythel Fachan, who was forced into that service by de Briouze. Trahaern ap Hywel was a large and powerful man who struggled a great deal as he was hauled up from the ground by his neck, causing the crossbeam of the gallows to break. Although the executioner, John of Baggeham, considered both men to be already dead when they fell to the ground they were nevertheless hanged again, "as an insult to their kin", and because it was the usual custom that hanged men could not be removed from the gallows without the lord's permission. The execution took place early in the morning, and the two men were left swinging from the gallows. John of Baggeham reported that he cut down Cragh's body at about 4:00 pm and sent it into the town at the request of William de Briouze's wife, Lady Mary. It is unclear what became of Trahaern ap Hywel, but his body may have been buried by the gallows.

The younger William de Briouze visited the house in Swansea to which Cragh's corpse had been taken that evening, and what he saw convinced him Cragh was dead. Describing the scene some years later he recalled that:

His [Cragh's] face was black and in parts bloody or stained with blood. His eyes had come out of their sockets and hung outside the eyelids and the sockets were filled with blood. His mouth, neck, and throat and the parts around them, and also his nostrils, were filled with blood, so that it was impossible in the natural course of things for him to breathe ... his tongue hung out of his mouth, the length of a man's finger, and it was completely black and swollen and as thick with the blood sticking to it that it seemed the size of a man's two fists together.

Witnesses reported that Cragh had voided his bowels and bladder while hanging from the gallows, which was considered at that time to be a sign of death.

== Resurrection ==
Historian Robert Bartlett has commented that "one of the largest uncertainties in the whole story of the death and resurrection of William Cragh is why Lady Mary [de Briouze] interceded for him," but intercede she did. John of Baggeham, when questioned about her motivation eighteen years after the event, could only reply that "Lady Mary had sought the body of this William"; he did not know why. Before the execution she had asked her husband to spare the two condemned men, but he refused. Then on hearing that Trahaern ap Hywel was dead, and believing Cragh was still alive, she once again asked that he be handed over to her, but de Briouze delayed until he was convinced Cragh was also dead. Then "he granted him [Cragh] to the said lady, such as he was, and ordered him to be taken down from the gallows." Lady Mary had "a special devotion" to Thomas de Cantilupe, the deceased Bishop of Hereford, and in her own words, upon hearing of Cragh's death, "on bended knee, she asked Saint Thomas de Cantilupe to ask God to restore life to William Cragh."

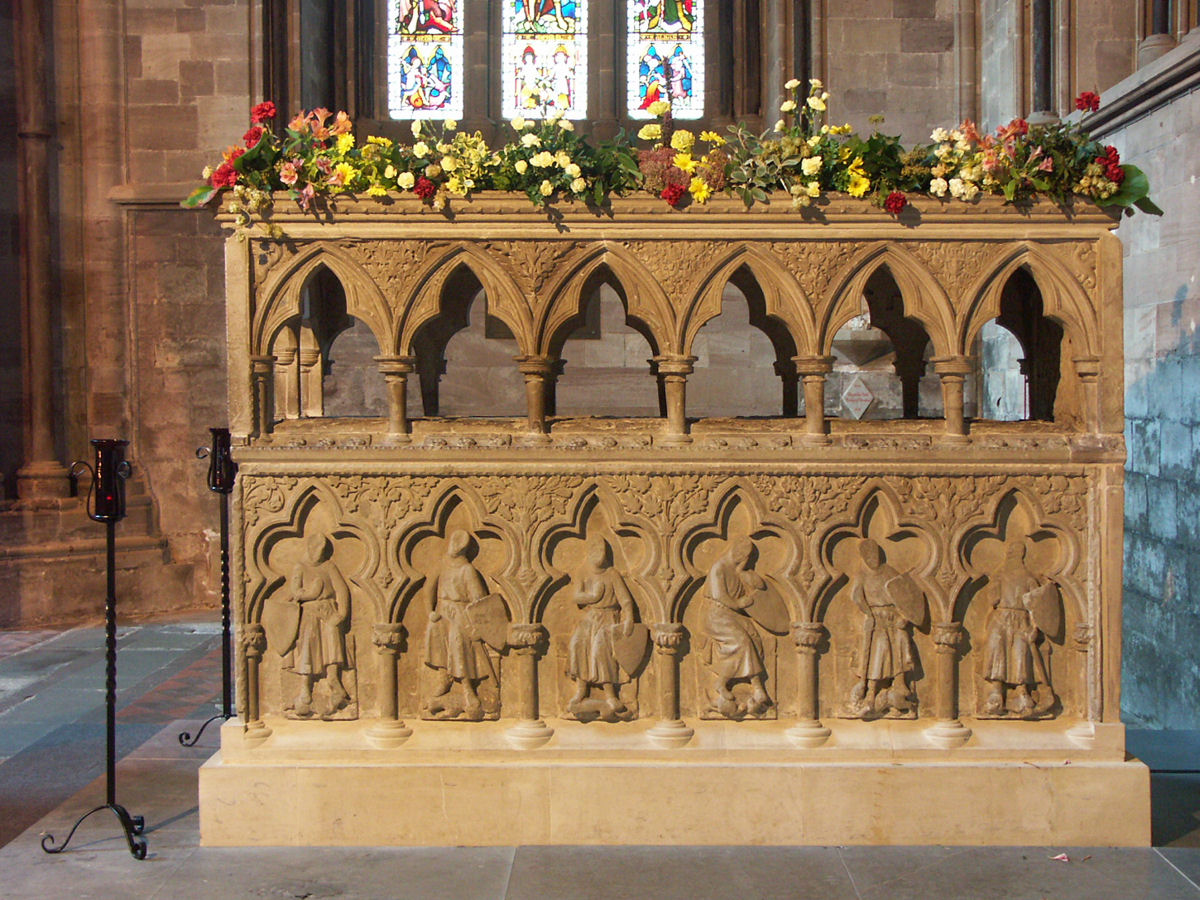
Thomas de Cantilupe's tomb in Hereford Cathedral

Cantilupe had died in Italy on 25 August 1282; his flesh was buried in that country after having been boiled from his bones, which were taken back to England. Cantilupe's tomb at Hereford Cathedral soon became the centre of a "pilgrim cult", and miracles began to be attributed to him. Lady Mary sent one of her ladies-in-waiting to measure Cragh's body with a length of thread, which implied a promise to offer to the saint a candle the length of the person on whose behalf the saint was being asked to intercede should the intercession be successful, a common practice during the medieval period.

Cragh's recovery began the day after his hanging, but it was some time – one witness said fifteen days – before he was able to stand unaided. That he did not recover more quickly cast doubt on the validity of the miracle, as miracles were supposed to be immediate, but "partial miracles" could be explained by the "lukewarm faith of those who had made the vow". Once sufficiently recovered, Cragh was summoned to appear at Swansea Castle, before Lord and Lady de Briouze. The chaplain, William of Codineston, was also present. Cragh explained, "with great fear and apprehension" according to the chaplain, that as he was being taken to the gallows he prayed to Thomas de Cantilupe to save him. His fear resulted from his concern that he might be executed again, and he had good reason to be worried. Although those who survived were usually pardoned, it was not unknown for them to be hanged again. Between the time of his hanging and his appearance at the castle Cragh may have convinced himself he had been saved by Cantilupe, or he may simply have decided it would be prudent for him to go along with the story for his own safety. Cragh went on to claim that as he was hanging from the gallows a bishop dressed all in white appeared and saved him either by supporting his feet or by replacing his tongue in his mouth, (Note: Witness accounts vary; Lady Mary and the chaplain reported that the bishop supported Cragh's feet, but the younger William de Briouze said the bishop put Cragh's tongue back in his mouth. The story of a hanged man being supported by his feet on the gallows by a saint was well known in medieval times.) although he did not identify the bishop in his vision as Thomas de Cantilupe.

Once he was sufficiently recovered, Cragh undertook a pilgrimage to Hereford, accompanied by Lord and Lady de Briouze, to thank Cantilupe for restoring his life. He walked barefoot on the three-day trip, wearing the rope he had been hanged with around his neck. The rope was left at Cantilupe's shrine, after which Cragh said he would make a pilgrimage to the Holy Land, although there is some doubt whether he subsequently even left Wales. Jussi Hanska has suggested that Cragh may have invented the pilgrimage story to escape from his companions.

== Papal investigation ==
Richard Swinefield, Cantilupe's successor as Bishop of Hereford, wrote to Pope Nicholas IV in a letter dated 19 April 1290 proposing the bishop for canonisation, but it was not until 1307 that an investigation into Cantilupe's saintliness was initiated by Pope Clement V. For the canonisation process to succeed, convincing evidence of miracles that Cantilupe had performed since his death had to be presented, one of which was that William Cragh had been brought back from the dead by the bishop's intercession. Three papal commissioners were appointed to conduct the inquiry: William de Testa, a papal tax collector in England, Ralph Baldock, Bishop of London, and William Durand the Younger, Bishop of Mende.

The investigation opened in London on 14 July 1307. The first three of the nine witnesses to Cragh's hanging to be heard were Lady Mary de Briouze, William Codineston, and the younger William de Briouze; his father had died in 1291. The commissioners were curious about the details of the execution, because if Cragh had not actually been killed then there could clearly have been no miracle. William de Briouze was in no doubt that the hanging had been properly conducted and pointed out it was customary that "if any subterfuge or trickery were discovered ... then the executioner himself would be hanged in turn." He added that any deception could be ruled out because of the hatred that he and his father had for Cragh, whom he described as "the worst of malefactors". The same point was made by William of Codineston: "the lord de Briouze and his justices, officials, and servants hated William Cragh very much and rejoiced greatly at his hanging and death."

For the convenience of other witnesses the commission moved to Hereford, where it resumed on 18 August 1307. The other six testifying to Cragh's execution included the hanged man himself, despite William de Briouze's stated belief that he had died of natural causes about two years earlier. The official language of the proceedings was ecclesiastical Latin, but Cragh spoke only Welsh, therefore two Franciscan friars from Hereford – John Young and Maurice of Pencoyd – were recruited as translators. Cragh is identified in the commission's records by his Welsh name, William ap Rhys, "of the parish of Swansea in the diocese of Saint Davids". Of the eight other witnesses called, five testified in French and three in English. In his evidence Cragh said he believed himself to have been about 28 at the time of his hanging and that his last conscious memory as he was dangling at the end of the rope was of the noise made by the crowd when Trahaern was hanged beside him. He denied his earlier story of having seen a vision of a white-clad bishop while he was hanging from the gallows, and instead claimed that the Virgin Mary had appeared to him on the morning of his execution, accompanied by "a lordly figure" she introduced as "St Thomas", who she said would save him from the gallows. Under questioning Cragh said he presumed the figure to be Cantilupe because he had been on pilgrimage to Cantilupe's shrine in Hereford and because on the day of his imprisonment he had "bent a penny ... to the honour of Saint Thomas so that he should liberate him." After hearing his testimony the commissioners physically examined Cragh, to confirm that he was indeed the man who had been hanged eighteen years earlier. Although they found no marks around his neck, they did discover some scarring on his tongue, according to Cragh caused by him having bitten it while hanging.

The investigation was conducted in an inquisitorial style; witnesses were not expected to make statements but only to respond to questions asked of them. Bartlett has observed that some of the questions asked by the commissioners were leading. During Cragh's interrogation, for instance, he was asked if "in his country after the time of his hanging, it was publicly and commonly ascribed, and still is ascribed, to a miracle performed by the merits of the Lord Saint Thomas that he obtained and recovered life after the hanging." Cragh of course had no motivation to answer other than "yes", which he did.

== Aftermath ==
Nothing more is known of Cragh after his testimony to the papal commission in 1307. Thirty-eight posthumous miracles attributed to Thomas de Cantilupe were examined by the commissioners and submitted for consideration by the pope and his advisors. Twelve were rejected after further analysis, including Cragh's resurrection, but no reasons were recorded. Pope John XXII formally announced Cantilupe's canonisation on 17 April 1320, thirty-eight years after the new saint's death.
