= Sele Priory =

Medieval English monastic house in Sussex

Coordinates: 50°53′15″N 0°18′20″W

Sele Priory was a medieval monastic house in Upper Beeding, West Sussex, England.

It was a Benedictine Order priory founded before 1126 and was dedicated to St Peter. It was a dependent priory of the abbey of St Florent in Saumur, France, and was thus considered an alien priory.

The house was associated with the Braose family from its foundation, and continued to receive gifts from members of the family, including the founder of the family, William de Braose, his son Philip de Braose, and their descendants John de Braose and William de Braose, 1st Baron Braose.

In 1396 the priory was allowed to become a native religious house, losing all ties to Saumur except an annual payment of 11 marks. In 1459 William Waynflete, the Bishop of Winchester acquired the patronage of the priory. He then incorporated the priory into his new foundation of Magdalen College, Oxford, although the actual dissolution of the priory did not take place until 1480, when the last monk was pensioned.

A Grade II listed house called The Priory now stands on the site of the original Priory of Sele. It probably contains material from the medieval building, but most of it dates from 1792.

== Burials ==
- William de Braose, 1st Baron Braose
