= Countess of Leicester =

Countess of Leicester is a title given to the wife of the Earl of Leicester. Women who have held the title include:

- Elizabeth of Vermandois, Countess of Leicester (c.1085–1131)
- Petronilla de Grandmesnil, Countess of Leicester (c.1145–1212)
- Loretta de Braose, Countess of Leicester (c.1185–c.1266)
- Alix de Montmorency (died 1221)
- Eleanor of England, Countess of Leicester (1215–1275)
- Aveline de Forz, Countess of Aumale (1259–1274)
- Blanche of Artois (c.1248–1302)
- Alice de Lacy, 4th Countess of Lincoln (1281–1348)
- Maud Chaworth (1282–1322)
- Isabel of Beaumont (c.1320–1361)
- Blanche of Lancaster (c.1345–1368)
- Constance of Castile, Duchess of Lancaster (1354–1394)
- Katherine Swynford (c.1350–1403)
- Mary de Bohun (c.1369–1394)
- Lettice Knollys (1543–1634)
- Barbara Sidney, Countess of Leicester (1563–1621)
- Dorothy Sidney, Countess of Leicester (c.1598–1659)
- Margaret Coke, Countess of Leicester (1700–1775)
- Alice Coke, Countess of Leicester (1855–1936)
