= Philip de Braose junior =

Philip de Braose junior (fl. 1172), was an Anglo-Norman noble most noted for his participation in Henry II's conquest of Ireland.

Braose was a younger son of Philip de Braose, lord of Bramber, and an uncle of William de Braose. He was one of the three captains of adventurers left in charge of Wexford at Henry's departure in 1172, and later in the same year he received a grant of the Kingdom of Thomond in the province of Munster, including the Gaelic-Norse city of Limerick ('Limericenæ videlicet regnum'). Supported by Robert Fitz-Stephen and Miles de Cogan, he set out to take possession but, on approaching the city, turned back in a panic. He was presumably dead on 12 January 1201, when Thomond was granted to his nephew William. The north-eastern part of Munster, the Kingdom of Ormond, was awarded to Theobald Walter, 1st Baron Butler.

== See also ==
- House of Braose
