= House of Braose =

Family of Anglo-Norman nobles in Britain and Normandy

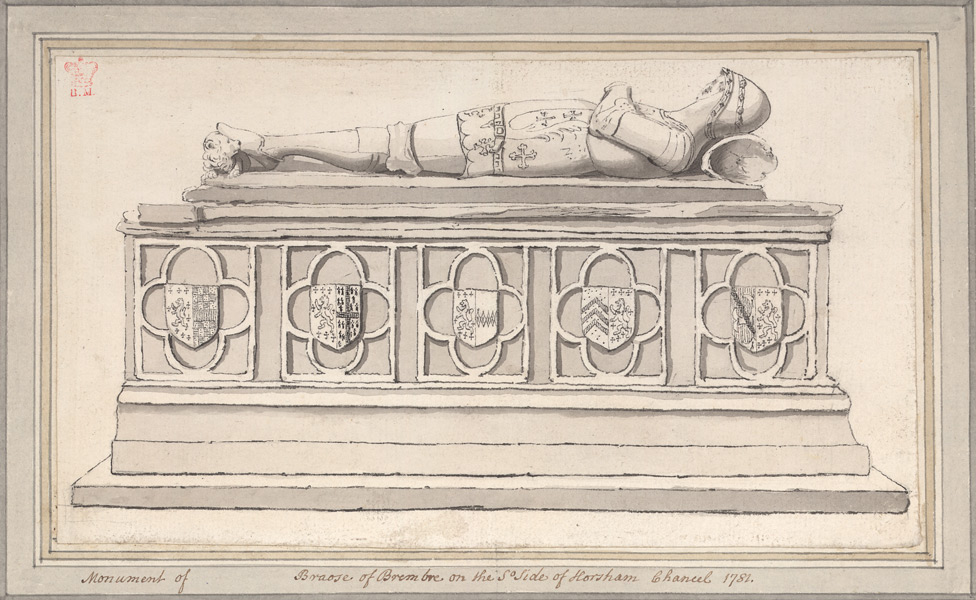
Funerary monument to Thomas de Braose (died 1395), dressed in full armour, his head resting on a helm. The tomb chest is decorated with quatrefoils and shields. South wall of sanctuary, St Mary's Church, Horsham, West Sussex.

The House of Braose (alias Breuse, Brewes, Brehuse, Briouze, Brewose etc., Latinised to de Braiosa) was a prominent family of Anglo-Norman nobles originating in Briouze, near Argentan, Orne, Normandy. Members of this family played a significant part in the Norman conquest of England and subsequent power struggles in England, Wales and Ireland in the 11th to 14th centuries.

== Lands held ==
The first English land-holding by the family was the feudal barony of Bramber in Sussex, granted by King William the Conqueror to William I de Braose (died 1093/1096) between the Norman Conquest of 1066 and the Domesday Book of 1086 in which he is shown as the holder of Bramber. Philip I made personal conquests in the Welsh Marches of Radnor and Builth. A moiety of the feudal barony of Barnstaple was inherited by William II from his mother. William III acquired the feudal barony of Kington c.1194 and the lordship of Gower in 1203, and a moiety of the feudal barony of Totnes in 1206. King John temporarily seized most of the lands of William III in 1208 but his infant son King Henry III (1216–1272) regranted most, except Barnstaple which was lost permanently, to his 3rd son Reginald. Reginald's son William V died leaving 4 daughters co-heiresses to all the family's Welsh lands, but Bramber and Gower passed back to the senior family line which held them until 1326 when William VII died leaving two daughters co-heiresses.

== Prominent land-holders ==
The most significant members of this family were as follows, with ordinal numbers based on those shown by Sanders, English Baronies:

- William I de Braose (died 1093/1096). 1st feudal baron of Bramber.
- Philip I de Braose (fl. 1096–1134), son of William I. 2nd feudal baron of Bramber. Became a Marcher Lord by his own conquests in Wales, namely of Radnor and Builth.
- William II de Braose (fl. 1135–1179), son of Philip I. 3rd feudal baron of Bramber. Inherited a moiety of the feudal barony of Barnstaple, Devon, from his mother Aenor de Totnes, daughter of Juhel de Totnes. Held 1/2 barony of Barnstaple. He married Bertha FitzWalter, the heiress of the marcher lordships of Brecon and Abergavenny.
  - Philip II de Braose (fl.1174), younger brother of William II.
- William III de Braose (1140/1150–1211), son of William II. 4th feudal baron of Bramber. c.1194 he acquired the feudal barony of Kington in Herefordshire.1203 granted by King John the Lordship of Gower. Infamous for the Christmas Day Massacre of Welsh Princes at Abergavenny Castle in 1175. 1206 gained control of 1/2 the feudal barony of Totnes, confiscated in 1087 from his great-grandfather Juhel de Totnes. 1208 King John seized much of his lands, including Bramber, re-granted by King Henry III in 1216 to his 3rd son Reginald de Braose (d.1228); the moiety of Barnstaple was granted permanently out of the family to Henry de Tracy and the moiety of Totnes was likewise granted away to Henry FitzCount but was regained by grant in 1218 to Reginald de Braose (d.1228). Kington was seized by King John in 1208, but was regranted to Reginald in 1216 by King Henry III.
- William IV de Braose (d.1210), eldest son of William III, pre-deceased father, father of John de Braose (d.1232). He died in royal captivity at Corfe Castle, Dorset, with his mother Maud de St Valery.
- Giles de Braose (d.s.p. 1215), Bishop of Hereford, 2nd son of William III. 5th feudal baron of Bramber. Died without progeny.
- Reginald de Braose (d.1228), 3rd son of William III. 6th feudal baron of Bramber. In 1216 he was regranted by King Henry III many of the lands seized by King John in 1208 from his father William III, including Bramber (which he temporarily surrendered in 1218 to his son William V), the moiety of Totnes, and Kington. Reginald also held Brecon, Abergavenny, Radnor and Builth.
- William V de Braose (d.1230), son of Reginald de Braose (d.1227), "Black William", 7th feudal baron of Bramber. He was executed by Llywelyn the Great. He died leaving 4 daughters as co-heiresses to all his lands, namely Builth (to Isabella wife of David ap Llywelyn, son of her father's executioner), Radnor (to Maud the wife of Roger Mortimer, 1st Baron Mortimer (d.1282)), Brecon and Kington (to Eleanor the wife of Humphrey V de Bohun (d.1265), who predeceased his father Humphrey de Bohun, 2nd Earl of Hereford (d.1275)) and Abergavenny and a moiety of Totnes (to Eva, wife of William III de Cantilupe (d.1254))
- John de Braose (d.1232), son of William IV. 8th feudal baron of Bramber. John acquired Gower in 1219 with help from Llywelyn Fawr and purchased Bramber from his uncle Reginald in 1226.
- William VI de Braose (died 1291), son of John. 9th feudal baron of Bramber. Created Baron by writ 1st Baron Braose as he is recorded as having sat in the parliament of April to May 1290, whereby he may be held to have been summoned by writ. Held Bramber and Gower.
- William VII de Braose (died 1326), son of William VI. 10th feudal baron of Bramber, 2nd Baron Braose. Held Bramber and Gower. On 29 December 1299 William VII de Braose was summoned to parliament. On his death in 1326, the first creation of the barony fell into abeyance. His co-heiresses were his daughters Aline and Joan.

== Others ==
- William de Braose, Bishop of Llandaff from 1266 to 1287

== Arms ==
=== William III de Braose ===
Party per fesse gules and azure, three garbs or

These arms were attributed to William III de Braose (d.1211) by Matthew Paris in Historia Anglorum, Chronica Majora, Part III (1250–59) British Library MS Royal 14 C VII f. 29v (shown there inverted to denote his death): Party per fesse gules and azure, three garbs or. Matthew Paris is not generally regarded as a reliable source for heraldry and these arms must be considered doubtful.

=== Giles and Reginald de Braose ===
Barry of six vair gules and ermine and azure

The arms of Giles de Braose (d.1215) and his brother Reginald de Braose (d.1228), younger sons of William III de Braose (d.1211) : Barry of six vair gules and ermine and azure.

=== William V de Braose ===
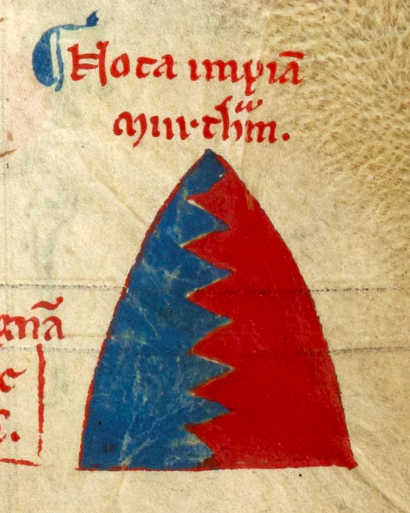
Party per pale indented gules and azure

Matthew Paris (c.1200-1259) in his Historia Anglorum (folio 116) attributed the arms, Party per pale indented gules and azure, to William V de Braose (d.1230). They appear as a marginal drawing of an inverted shield referring to his "impious murder" (Nota impiam murthram). However Matthew Paris depicts different arms for him in his Chronica Majora, Part III, fol.75v, in an inverted shield: Gules, four piles meeting in base or

=== William VII de Braose ===
Azure crusilly (i.e. semy of crosses-crosslet), a lion double queued rampant or

The Falkirk Roll of Arms c.1298 blazons the following arms for William VII de Braose, 2nd Baron Braose (1260–1326): Azure crusilly (i.e. semy) of cross-crosslets, a lion double queued rampant or. These are the arms shown on his seal appended to the Barons' Letter of 1301. Similar arms, with a single queue, had been adopted by his father, William VI de Braose, 1st Baron Braose (died 1291).

== See also ==
- Baron Braose

== Sources ==
- Sanders, I.J., English Baronies, Oxford, 1960: Braose baronies in Wales, p. 21; Kington, p. 57; Totnes, p. 89; Bramber, p. 108; Barnstaple, p. 104
