= Hugh Foliot =

English bishop (c. 1155–1234)

- Bishop of Hereford
- Elected: June 1219
- Term ended: 7 August 1234
- Predecessor: Hugh de Mapenor
- Successor: Ralph de Maidstone
- Other post: Archdeacon of Shropshire

Orders
- Consecration: 27 October 1219

Personal details
- Born: c. 1155
- Died: 7 August 1234
- Buried: Hereford Cathedral
- Denomination: Catholic

Hugh Foliot (c. 1155 – 7 August 1234) was a medieval Bishop of Hereford. Related somehow to his predecessor at Hereford, he served as a priest and papal judge as well as being an unsuccessful candidate as Bishop of St David's in Wales. In 1219, he was appointed Bishop of Hereford. During his time in office, he mostly attended to ecclesiastical duties, but did occasionally serve as a royal administrator. He helped found a hospital and a priory, and died in 1234 after a months-long illness.

== Early life ==
Foliot possibly was the son of Roger Foliot and his wife Rohese. Roger held three knight's fees in Northamptonshire. Probably born sometime between 1150 and 1160, Hugh was related in some manner to Robert Foliot, his predecessor at Hereford. He was a canon of Hereford Cathedral before becoming Archdeacon of Shropshire by May 1186. Foliot is a frequent witness on charters as archdeacon, but little else is known of his tenure of the office. From 1212 to 1219, he served as a papal judge-delegate three times. In 1215 he was also King John's candidate for the see of St David's in Wales, but was not elected.

After Foliot's failed candidacy as bishop, in February 1216 John appointed him to the benefice of Colwall in Herefordshire, the king having the ability to make the appointment because Giles de Braose, the Bishop of Hereford, who would normally have made the appointment, had recently died. Also from this time comes Foliot's patronage of Robert Grosseteste, the theologian and future Bishop of Lincoln.

== Bishop ==
Foliot had been one of three members of the cathedral chapter from Hereford sent to King Henry III's court to secure permission for the chapter to hold an election in 1219 Foliot was elected to the see of Hereford in June 1219 and consecrated on 27 October 1219 along with William de Goldcliff, the Bishop of Llandaff, at Canterbury.

The new bishop accompanied Peter des Roches, the Bishop of Winchester, on a pilgrimage in 1221. Because des Roches travelled to Spain to the shrine of St James at Compostela, and it is known that Foliot accompanied him, the statement by a medieval chronicler from Dunstable that Foliot's destination was not certain, being either Rome or Compostela, should be discounted.

Foliot spent most of his tenure of office in his diocese, only rarely attending the royal court or being assigned governmental duties. On 30 December 1223, Foliot assumed one of those duties, when he took custody of Hereford Castle after it was surrendered by Hubert de Burgh, during the redistribution of royal castles when de Burgh ousted des Roches from power. He was also appointed to determine the size of the royal forest in Gloucestershire. Foliot also founded a hospital in Ledbury, devoted to St Katherine. He helped found Alberbury Priory, a house of the Grandmontine order. In his cathedral, he reorganised the benefices and offices of the chapter, as well as endowing further benefices.

Foliot died 7 August 1234, after an illness that began in the spring. He was buried in Hereford Cathedral, where his tomb survives. Foliot appointed his younger brother Thomas to offices in the diocese, first as precentor in the 1220s and then around 1230 as treasurer of the cathedral chapter.

== Citations ==
Catholic Church titles
Preceded by Hugh de Mapenor	Bishop of Hereford; 1219–1234	Succeeded by Ralph de Maidstone
