= Hugh de Mapenor =

13th-century Bishop of Hereford

- Bishop of Hereford
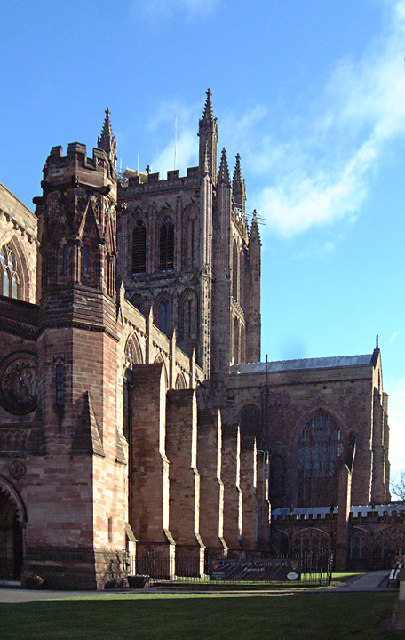
- Exterior view of Hereford Cathedral, where Mapenor is buried.
- Elected: 3 February 1216
- Term ended: April 1219
- Predecessor: Giles de Braose
- Successor: Hugh Foliot
- Other post: Dean of Hereford

Orders
- Consecration: 18 December 1216 by Sylvester, Bishop of Worcester

Personal details
- Died: April 1219
- Buried: Hereford Cathedral

Hugh de Mapenor (or Hugh de Mapenore; died April 1219) was a medieval Bishop of Hereford. Although educated and given the title of magister, or "master", the details of his schooling are unknown. Mapenor was a clerk for Giles de Braose, his predecessor as bishop. Later, Mapenor served as Dean of Hereford before being elected as bishop against the wishes of King John of England. During his short episcopate, he supported John's son and successor King Henry III of England, and was active in his diocese, as a number of surviving documents show. He also served as a diplomat for the king.

== Early life ==
Mapenor was the son of Robert de Mapenore and his wife Matilda, who lived in Herefordshire at Hampton, Herefordshire near Leominster. Where or how he was educated is unknown, but he was given the title of magister, which implies he studied at some school and attained a degree of education.

Mapenor served William de Braose as a clerk from 1189 to 1196, and then served William's son Giles de Braose, Bishop of Hereford. He occupied the office of Dean of Hereford before 29 September 1202. During his time at Hereford, he was the subject of the Prose Salernitan Questions, which compared his sexual powers to three other clerks. He also served as a judge for the papacy and defended the cathedral chapter in two disputes over the chapter's rights.

When the Braose family fled England in 1208, with Giles going to France and William going to Ireland, Mapenor also left, going to Ireland, where he appears as a witness on documents of William de Braose's. It is unclear when he returned to England, but by January 1212 Mapenor was once more in Hereford.

== Bishop of Hereford ==
Mapenor was elected to the see of Hereford on 3 February 1216. Mapenor was elected by the cathedral chapter in spite of the fact that his name was not on the list of possible candidates given to the chapter by King John of England. The king objected to the election and took the case to Pope Honorius III, but the king died before the case was decided. John had objected because he claimed the cathedral chapter, which elected Mapenor, was excommunicate when they met for the election of the new bishop, which would have made the election invalid. His election had been overseen by the papal legate Guala Bicchieri, who was also assigned the case by the papacy after John objected.

Bicchieri decided the case shortly after the death of John on the night of 18–19 October 1216, in Mapenor's favour. Mapenor gave Stephen Langton, the Archbishop of Canterbury, and Mapenor's ecclesiastical superior, a declaration of obedience on 27 October 1216, and was consecrated on 18 December 1216 by Sylvester the Bishop of Worcester.

Although Mapenor's time as bishop was short – just over two years – over 20 of his charters survive. These include a number for Leominster Priory and Reading Abbey. He also dealt with a dispute over the rights of a Norman abbey, Lyre Abbey, over churches it possessed in the diocese of Hereford, settling it by making the churches part of a prebend in Hereford Cathedral held by the abbot of Lire. Mapenor supported the new king Henry III in his efforts to suppress the rebellion begun under Henry's father, King John. Mapenor was with the forces of the king before the Battle of Lincoln in May 1217. The bishop was also present when the king and Llywelyn of Gwynedd, a Welsh prince, concluded a peace treaty at Worcester in March 1218.

The king employed Mapenor in April as a diplomatic escort, ordering the bishop to bring some of the southern Welsh princes to Woodstock to swear fealty to Henry III. In June of that year, Mapenor attended the consecration of the new Worcester Cathedral. He was the recipient of one of a series of writs sent to bishops to stop the persecution of Jews. These writs may have resulted from a decision of the king's council to oppose some acts of the Fourth Lateran Council of 1215, which placed restrictions on Jews.

== Death ==
Mapenor died in April 1219, probably on the 16th, although older sources give a date of the 13th. He had issued a charter as recently as 14 April 1219. He was buried in Hereford Cathedral. One of his surviving charters documents a licence given to Leominster Priory as alms for the souls of his parents and his predecessor as bishop, Giles de Braose.

== Citations ==
Catholic Church titles
Preceded by Giles de Braose	Bishop of Hereford; 1216–1219	Succeeded by Hugh Foliot
