= Maud de Braose =

English noblewoman

- Lady of Bramber
- Born: c. 1155; France
- Died: 1210 (aged 54–55); Corfe Castle, Dorset, England
- Cause of death: Starvation
- Spouse: William de Braose, 4th Lord of Bramber
- Issue Detail: Giles de Braose; Reginald de Braose; Margaret de Braose; Loretta de Braose
- Father: Bernard de St. Valéry
- Mother: Matilda

Maud de Braose, Lady of Bramber (c. 1155 – 1210) was an Anglo-Norman noblewoman who was active in the Welsh Marches. She incurred the wrath and enmity of King John of England, who had her starved to death in the dungeon of Corfe Castle along with her eldest son. In contemporary records, she was described as beautiful, very wise, doughty, and vigorous. She kept up the war against the Welsh and conquered much from them.

She features in many Welsh myths and legends; and is also known to history as Matilda de Braose, Moll Wallbee and Lady of La Haie.

== Family and marriage ==
Maud was born in France in about 1155, the child of Bernard de St. Valéry of Hinton Waldrist in Berkshire (now Oxfordshire) and his first wife, Matilda. Her paternal grandfather was Reginald de St. Valéry (died c.1162).

Sometime around 1166, Maud married William de Braose, 4th Lord of Bramber. He also held the lordships of Gower, Hay, Brecon, Radnor, Builth, Abergavenny, Kington, Painscastle, Skenfrith, Grosmont, White Castle and Briouze in Normandy. When King John ascended the throne of England in 1199, William became a court favourite and was also awarded the lordship of Limerick, Ireland. Maud had a marriage portion, Tetbury, from her father's estate.

Maud supported her husband's military ambitions and he put her in charge of Hay Castle and surrounding territory. She is often referred to in history as the Lady of Hay. In 1198, Maud defended Painscastle in Elfael against a massive Welsh attack led by Gwenwynwyn, Prince of Powys. She successfully held off Gwenwynwyn's forces for three weeks until English reinforcements arrived. Over three thousand Welsh were killed. Painscastle was known as Matilda's Castle by the locals.

Maud and William are reputed to have had 16 children. The best documented of these are listed below.

=== Issue ===
- Maud de Braose (died 29 December 1210), married Gruffydd ap Rhys II, by whom she had two sons, Rhys and Owain.
- William de Braose (died 1210). Starved to death with his mother in either Windsor or Corfe Castle. He married Maud de Clare, daughter of Richard de Clare, 3rd Earl of Hertford, by whom he had issue, including John de Braose.
- Margaret de Braose (died after 1255), married Walter de Lacy, Lord of Meath, son of Hugh de Lacy, Lord of Meath and Rohese of Monmouth.
- Reginald de Braose (died between 5 May 1227 and 9 June 1228), married, firstly, Grace, daughter of William Briwere, and, secondly, in 1215, Gwladus Ddu, daughter of Welsh Prince Llewelyn the Great. He had issue by his first wife, including William de Braose, who married Eva Marshal.
- Giles de Braose, Bishop of Hereford (died 13 November 1215)
- John de Braose (died before 27 May 1205), married Amabil de Limesi.
- Loretta de Braose, married Robert de Beaumont, 4th Earl of Leicester. She died without issue.
- Annora de Braose, married Hugh de Mortimer and later became a recluse at Iffley.
- Flandrina de Braose, Abbess of Godstow, (elected 1242, deposed 1248).

== Enmity of King John ==
In 1208, William de Braose quarrelled with his friend and patron, King John. The reason is not known, but it is alleged that Maud made indiscreet comments regarding the murder of King John's nephew, Duke Arthur I of Brittany. There was also a large sum of money (five thousand marks) that de Braose owed the king. Whatever the reason, John demanded that Maud's son William be sent to him as a hostage for her husband's loyalty. Maud refused and stated loudly within earshot of the king's officers that "she would not deliver her children to a king who had murdered his own nephew." The king quickly led troops to the Welsh border and seized all of the castles that belonged to William de Braose. Maud and her eldest son William fled to Ireland, where they found refuge at Trim Castle with the de Lacys, the family of her daughter Margaret. In 1210, King John sent an expedition to Ireland. Maud and her son escaped but were apprehended in Galloway by Donnchadh, Earl of Carrick. After being briefly held at Carrickfergus Castle, they were dispatched to England.

=== Imprisonment and death ===
Maud and William were first imprisoned at Windsor Castle, but were shortly afterwards transferred to Corfe Castle in Dorset, where they were placed inside the dungeon. The contemporaneous History of the Dukes of Normandy and Kings of England claims Maud and William both starved to death. It is also said that John had her and her son imprisoned at Corfe Castle and ordered that a sheaf of oats and one piece of raw bacon be given to them. He did not allow them to have any more food. After eleven days, the mother was found dead between her son's legs. Her son, who was also dead, was found sitting upright, but leaning against the wall. So desperate was the mother that she had eaten the flesh from her own son's cheeks. The manner in which they met their deaths so outraged the English nobility that Magna Carta, which King John was forced to sign in 1215, contains clause 39: "No man shall be taken, imprisoned, outlawed, banished or in any way destroyed, nor will we proceed against or prosecute him, except by the lawful judgement of his peers or by the law of the land."

Maud's husband died a year later in exile in France, where he had gone disguised as a beggar to escape King John's wrath after the latter had declared him an outlaw, following his alliance with Llywelyn the Great, whom he had assisted in open rebellion against the king, an act which John regarded as treason. He was buried in the Abbey of St. Victor, Paris.

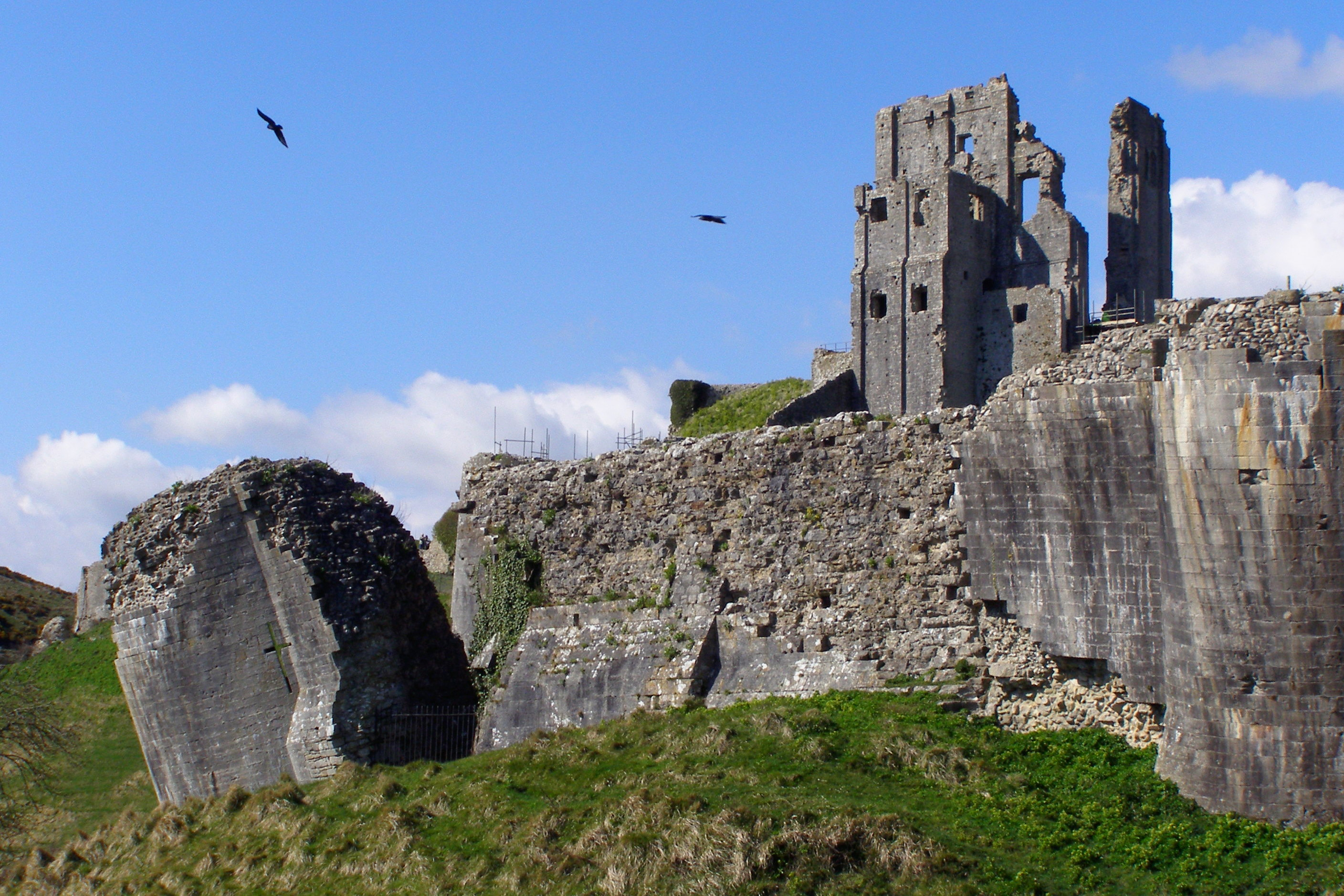
The ruins of Corfe Castle in Dorset, within whose dungeon Maud de Braose and her son William were starved to death

Maud's daughter Margaret de Lacy founded a religious house, the Hospital of St. John, in Aconbury, Herefordshire in her memory. On 10 October 1216, eight days before his death, King John conceded three carucates of land in the royal forest of Aconbury to Margaret for the construction of the religious house. He sent the instructions to her husband Walter de Lacy, who held the post of Sheriff of Hereford, by letters patent.

== Legends ==
Maud de Braose features in many Welsh folklore myths and legends. There is one legend which says that Maud built the castle of Hay-on-Wye single-handed in one night, carrying the stones in her apron. She was also said to have been extremely tall and often donned armour while leading troops into battle.

The legend about her building Hay Castle probably derives from the time she added the gateway arch to a tower, which was built in the 1180s.

== In fiction ==
A book entitled Lady of Hay was written by author Barbara Erskine. It is a highly fictional account of Maud's life, simultaneously set in the past and in 20th-century England, where she was fictitiously reincarnated as a modern Englishwoman. Maud is also mentioned in the novel Here Be Dragons by Sharon Penman, and in the novels To Defy A King and The Scarlet Lion by Elizabeth Chadwick, and in Jean Plaidy's novel The Prince of Darkness about King John. The incident of Maud's starvation and death at the hands of King John is fictionalized in Pamela Kaufman's The Prince of Poison.

== Bibliography ==
- Costain, Thomas B. (1962). The Conquering Family. Graden City, New York: Doubleday and Company, Inc.
