= Bishop's Palace, Llandaff =

Ruined palace in Cardiff, Wales

Bishop's Palace
- Llandaff Castle; Bishop's Castle; Old Bishop's Palace
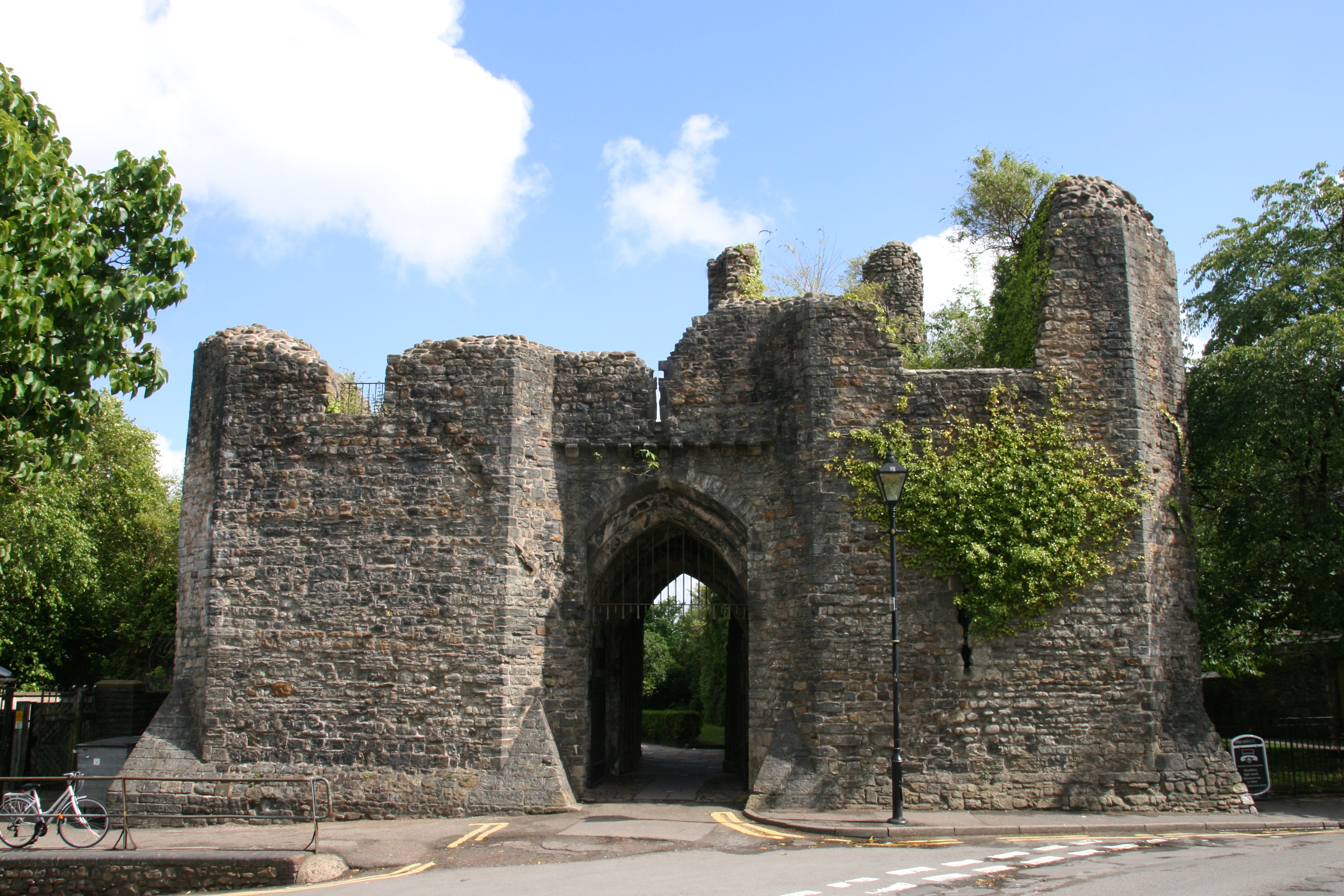
- Bishop's Palace Gatehouse in 2011

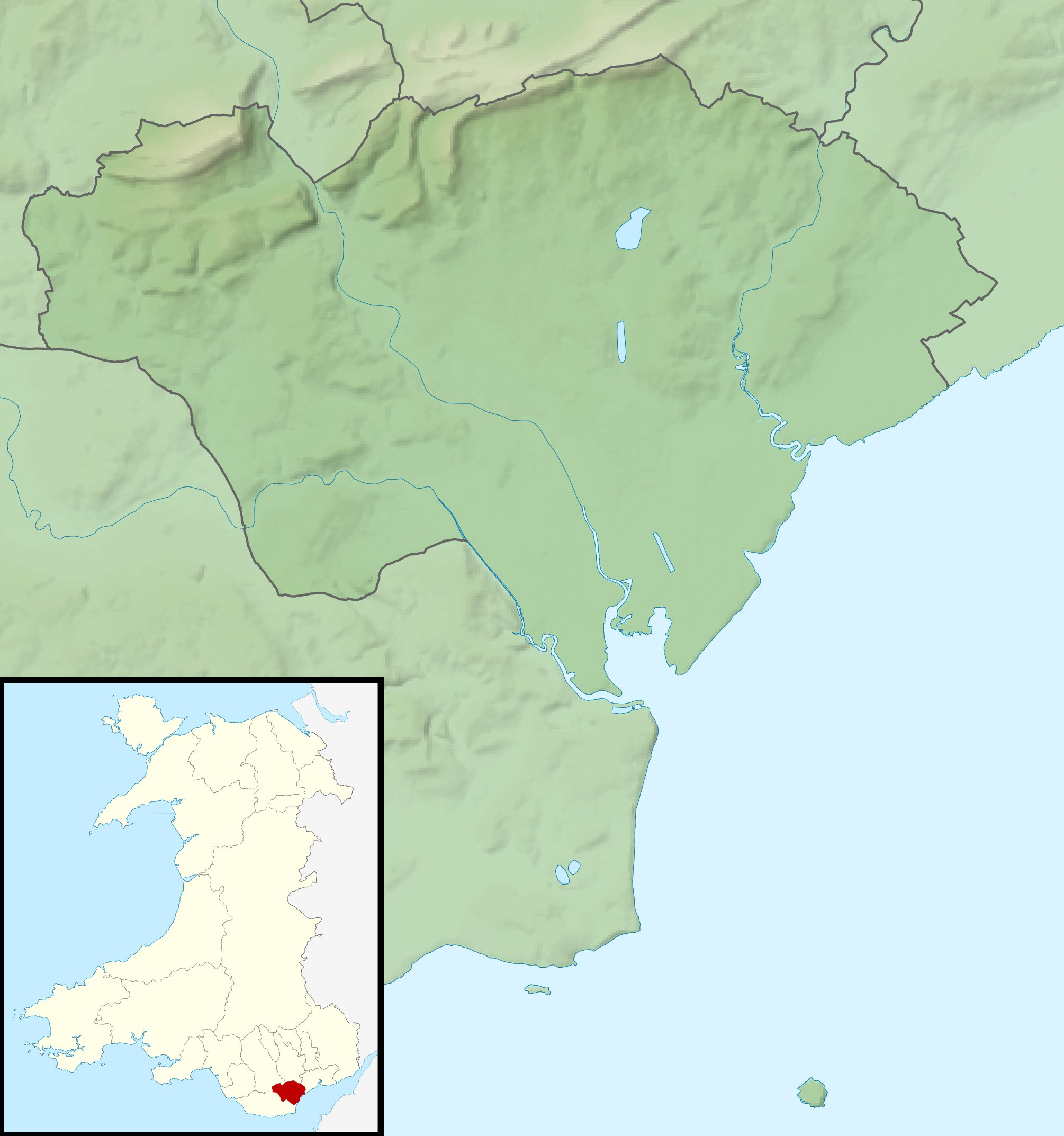
- Location of the Bishop's Palace in Cardiff
- 51.49459°N 3.21755°W
- Location: Llandaff, Cardiff

History
- Original use: Residence of the bishops of Llandaff

Site notes
- Owner: Cardiff Council

Scheduled monument
- Official name: Old Bishop's Palace, Llandaff
- Reference no.: GM073

Listed Building – Grade I
- Official name: Ruins of the Old Bishop's Palace
- Designated: 19 May 1975; 51 years ago
- Reference no.: 13718

The Bishop's Palace (Welsh: Llys yr Esgob) which is also known as Llandaff Castle or Bishop's Castle or the Old Bishop's Palace, is the ruined residence of the bishops of Llandaff. It is located a short distance to the south of Llandaff Cathedral in Cardiff, Wales. The twin-towered gatehouse is one of the few remaining structures.

== History ==
Historic images of Bishop's Palace

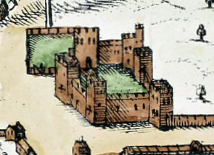
John Speed's depiction of the Bishop's Palace in 1610

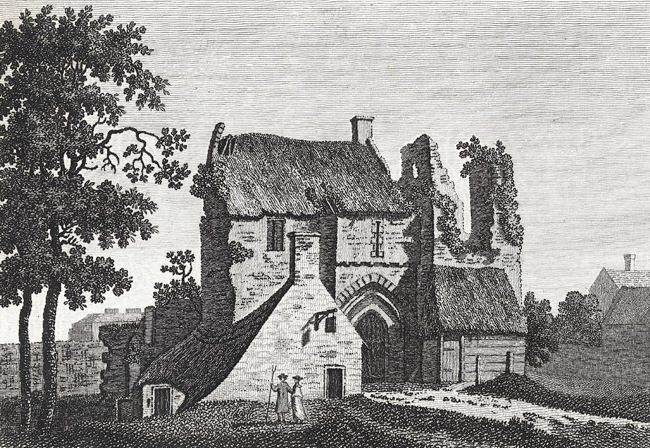
Richard Bernard Godfrey's 1775 engraving of the Bishop's Palace

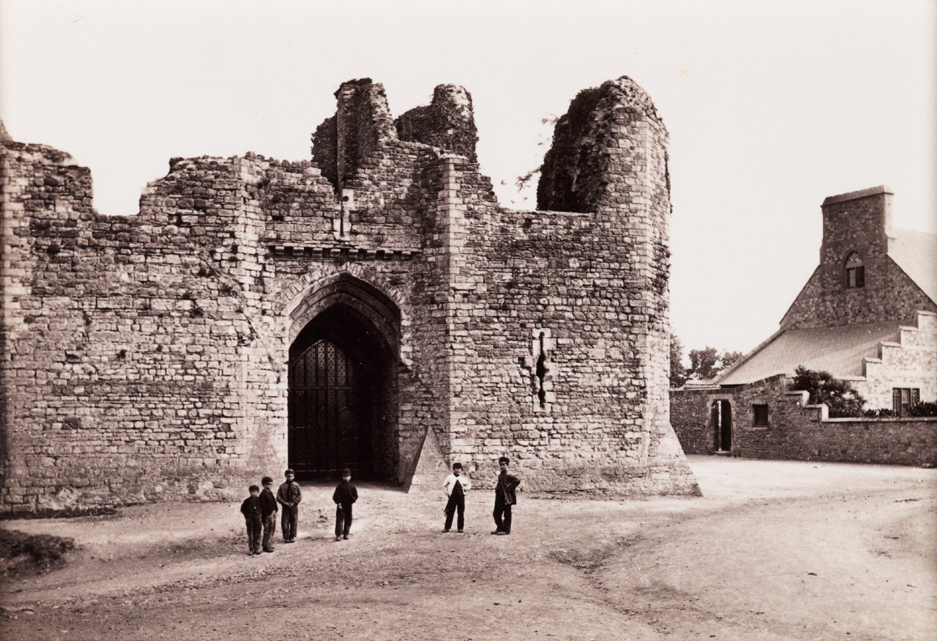
Francis Bedford's photograph of the Bishop's Palace c.1880

The surviving gatehouse resembles the architecture of Caerphilly Castle, which may indicate that the same master mason worked on both fortifications. This would date the Palace to the time of William de Braose who became Bishop of Llandaff in 1266. It is believed the Palace was attacked and damaged by Owain Glyndŵr in the rebellion of 1402–05, and was subsequently abandoned by the bishop of the period, who moved to live at Mathern Palace in Monmouthshire; bishops did not return to live near their cathedral again until 1850. The Bishops Palace was intact in 1610 when it was shown in a plan by John Speed, but was probably destroyed during the English Civil War.

== The site ==
The Bishop's Palace was really a small medieval fortress set in a rectangular enclosure measuring 52 by 40 m (170 by 130 ft). It had four irregular lengths of curtain wall, three towers and a gatehouse at the west corner. One of the towers was square and another was round, while the third has disappeared completely. The remains of the gatehouse survive to this day. It has two towers and originally had two storeys above the basement, a vaulted archway, a portcullis slot and a great oak door with much decorative ironwork. There would have been timber buildings within the courtyard, but there is now no sign of these.

Present-day images inside Bishop's Palace
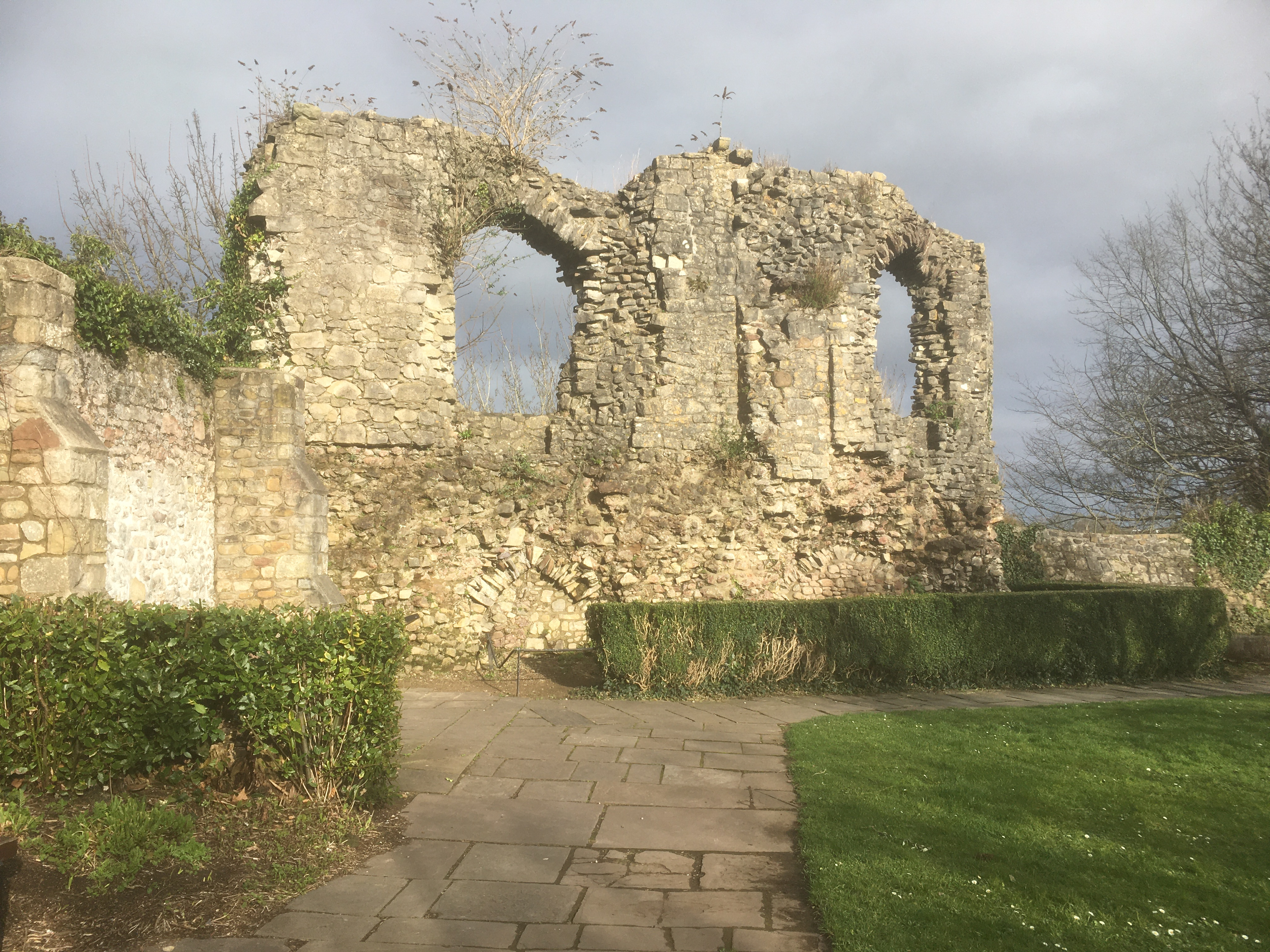
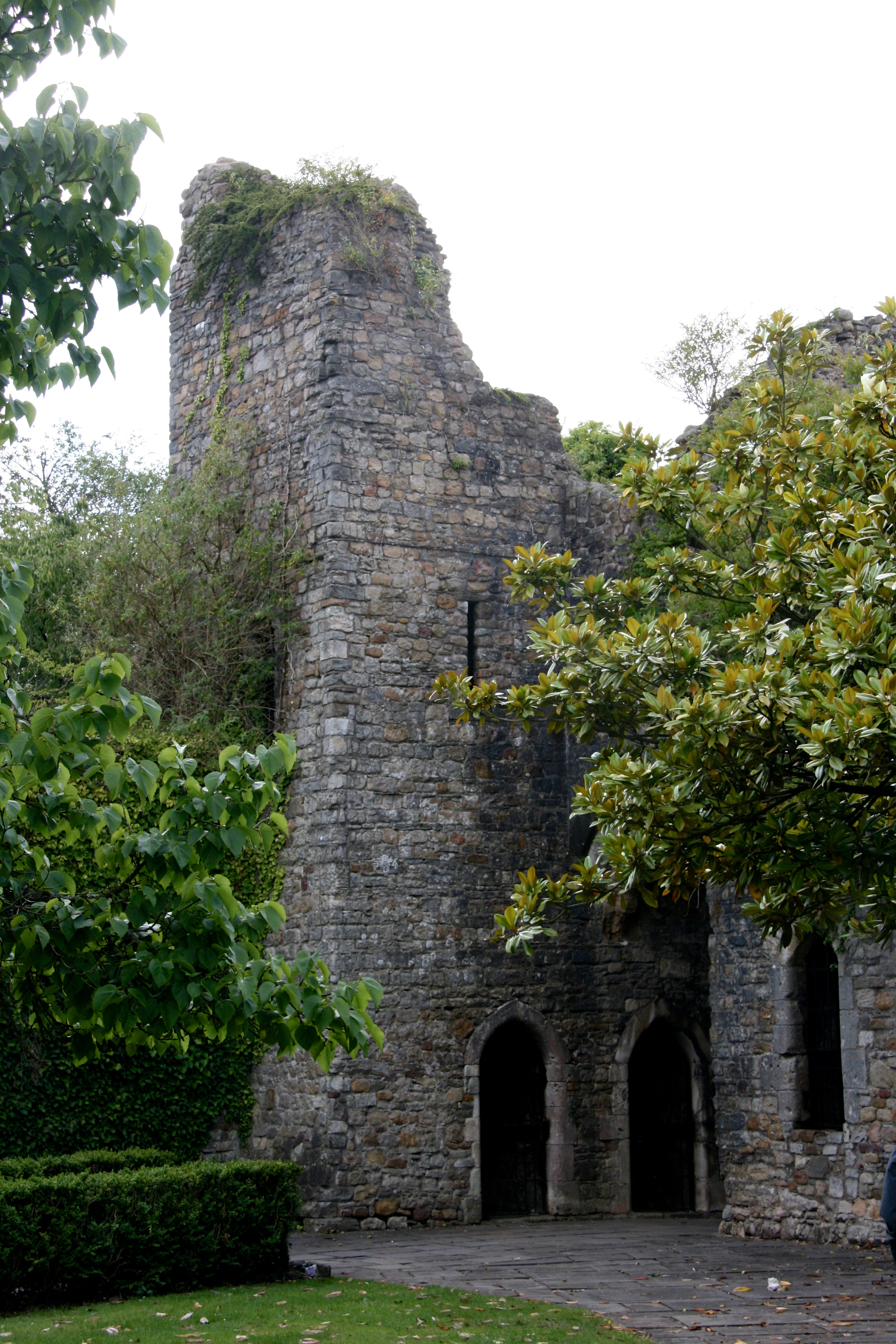

The Bishop's Palace buildings are Grade I listed, meaning they are of exceptional architectural and historical interest.

== See also ==
- Grade I listed buildings in Cardiff
- List of castles in Wales
- Castles in Great Britain and Ireland
