= Totnes Priory =

Monastery in Totnes, Devon, United Kingdom

Coordinates: 50.431854°N 3.687836°W

Totnes Priory was a priory at Totnes in south Devon, England.

It was founded by Juhel de Totnes, feudal baron of Totnes.

== Foundation charter ==
The foundation charter dated circa 1087 is held at the Devon Heritage Centre in Exeter under reference 312M/TY1, the text of which, translated from Latin, is as follows:

"Juhellus filius Aluuredi. To God and martyrs ss. Sergius and Bachus, and the Abbot of the place, and d. Tetbaldus, monk, personally representing all the brothers. a) The Church of S. Mary de Tottenes, with the fees of the priests Hurbertus, Anschitillus, Suuetinus and Ansgotus, the fee of Rodbertus Tornator, and the land beneath the Church, tithes and a dam for a fishery. Also four linen copes, an altar covering, two hangings, one white garment, one silver gilt cross and two wooden ones.

For the salvation of William King of the English, his Queen, sons and daughters; for himself, father and mother and brother Rodbertus. This grant was made to d. Tetbaldus by the key of the monastery, the bell-rope and a knife. Fecit autem hoc donum coram multis bone memorie viris quorum ista sunt nomina: Martinus de Walis; Rogerius senescallus Ausgotus presbyter; Rogerius presbyter; Hubertus presbyter; Anschitillus presbyter; Torgis de la forest; Oddo senescallus; Rodbertus filius David; Godselmus dechinum; Hubertus frater eius; Rodbertus debruelia; Gaufridus senescallus; Garinus dispensator; Radulfus malban; Rodbertus Torneator; Godefredus filius Achardi; Raynaldus; Durandus; Rogerius homo bodini deuer; Herueus Hauenellus; Rodbertus decuria; Anschitillus duxe; Garinus et Gaufridus et raynaldus homines Sancti Sergii et alii multi. b) The priests Hubertus and Anschitillus re-enfeoffed as chaplains of S. Sergius. c) [later addition]".

There is appended to it a note of divisions of tithes in the manors of Roger de Nunant, Juhel's successor in the barony of Totnes. Mentioned are: Bredefort, Asprintona, Conourda, Turlestagno, Buccelanda, Cherletona, Pola, Briseham, Cherchetona, Clauatona, Trecechota, Paurdan, Tressetona, Essleia, Urdihella, Lega, Brutefort; tithe of Radulfus de Eschagriis, Rogerius de Estancomba; of Coleton, Totenesio, Corno-orda; of Robert son of David of Bocchedona and Loleurda and Samarus the priest. "Given by Gaufridus dapifer sancto Sergio by his proxy Turgisu, who placed the gift on the altar of S. Mary. Videntibus landrico milite et turgiso monacho et fulcone et harduino et hetdiuo presbitero quin eciam de omnibus emptionibus quas facturus est similiter donum super altare sancte marie portauit". (No seal).

== Dissolution ==
At the Dissolution of the Monasteries the Priory and some of its lands were purchased by Walter Smith (d.1555), a merchant of Totnes, whose Easter Sepulchre type monument survives in the south chancel aisle of St Mary's Church, Totnes. In 1544 he conveyed the properties to feoffees for the uses of himself and his son Bernard Smith (by 1522-1591), MP for Totnes in 1558, mayor of Totnes 1549-50 and c.1565-6 and escheator of Devon and Cornwall 1567-8.
