= Baron Braose =

Extinct barony in the Peerage of England

Arms of William de Braose, 2nd Baron Braose (1260-1326) as blazoned in the Falkirk Roll of Arms, c.1298, which gives the tail as doubled: Azure crusilly (i.e. semy) of crosses crosslet and a lion double queued rampant or. Similar arms (single queued) were first adopted by William de Braose, 1st Baron Braose (died 1291)

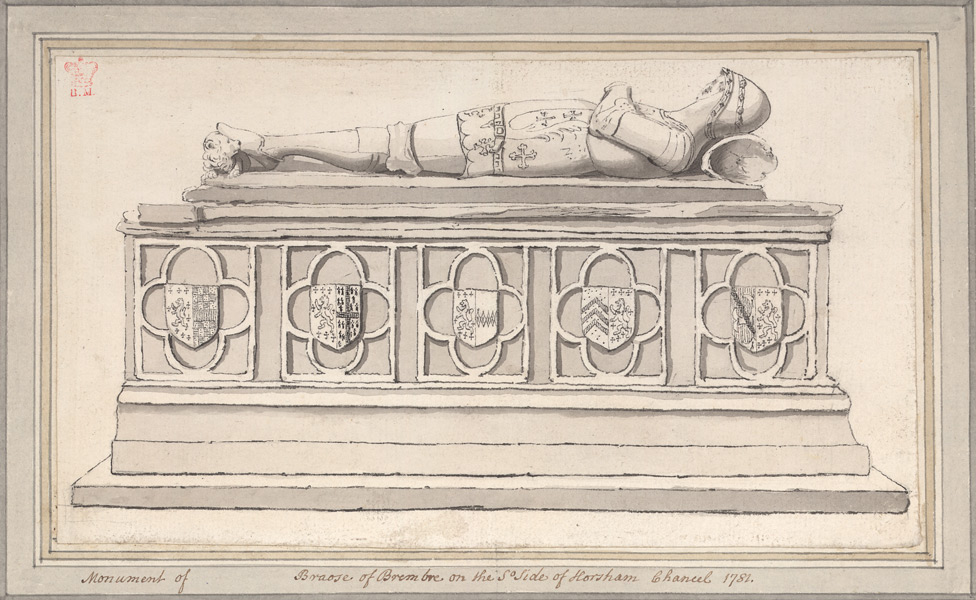
Funerary monument to Thomas de Braose, 3rd Baron Braose (1352–1395) (Baron of the 2nd creation), dressed in full armour, his head resting on a helm. The tomb chest is decorated with quatrefoils and heraldic escutcheons showing the lion rampant Braose arms impaling the arms of various heiresses. South wall of sanctuary, St Mary's Church, Horsham, West Sussex. Drawing by Samuel Hieronymus Grimm, 1781.

The title of Baron Braose was created twice in the Peerage of England. Some records from the period of the second creation spell the name Brewose.

William de Braose is recorded to have sat in the Parliament of April and May 1290, so is deemed to have been summoned as a lord of Parliament. On 29 December 1299, his son William de Braose was summoned to Parliament. On his death in 1326, the first creation of the barony fell into abeyance.

On 25 February 1342, Thomas de Braose was summoned to Parliament. On the death of the fifth baroness in 1399, the second creation of the barony became extinct.

== Baron Braose (First Creation) ==
- William de Braose, 1st Baron Braose (died 1291)
- William de Braose, 2nd Baron Braose (died 1326) (abeyant 1326)

== Barons Braose (1342) ==
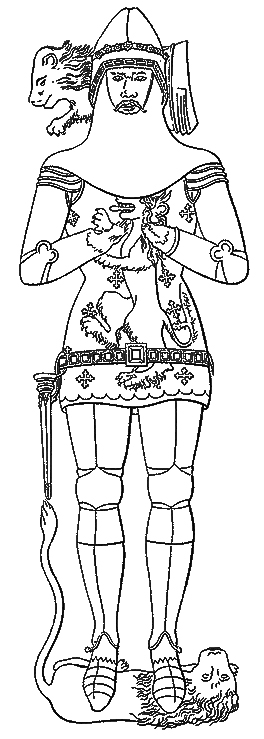
Thomas de Braose, 1st Baron

- Thomas de Braose, 1st Baron Braose (1302–1361)
- John de Braose, 2nd Baron Braose (died 1367)
- Thomas de Braose, 3rd Baron Braose (1352–1395)
- Thomas de Braose, 4th Baron Braose (died 1395)
- Elizabeth de Saye, 5th Baroness Braose (died 1399)

== See also ==
- House of Braose
