= William de Braose, 2nd Baron Braose =

13th-century Anglo-Norman baron

William de Braose
- Baron Braose, Lord of Bramber, Lord of Gower
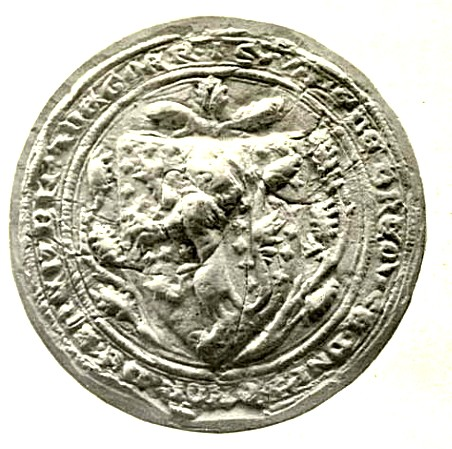
- Seal of William de Braose, 2nd Baron Braose, appended to the Barons' Letter, 1301, showing arms of Braose on an escutcheon: Azure semy of crosses-crosslet and a lion rampant or .
- Born: c. 1260
- Died: 1326
- Noble family: House of Braose
- Spouses: Agnes (family name unknown); Elizabeth de Sully, daughter of Raymund de Sully
- Issue: Aline de Braose, Joan de Braose, William de Braose
- Father: William de Braose, 1st Baron Braose
- Mother: Aline, daughter of Thomas de Multon
- Occupation: Nobleman

Arms of William de Braose as blazoned in the Falkirk Roll of Arms, c. 1298, which gives the tail as doubled: Azure crusilly (i.e. semy) of crosses crosslet a lion double queued rampant or

William de Braose (Note: Sometimes written de Briouze, de Breuse, de Brewes or de Brewose. His seal gives the spelling de Breouse.) (c. 1260–1326) was the second Baron Braose, as well as Lord of Gower and Lord of Bramber. He was held as a hostage after being captured in 1264 during the Second Barons' War, and records of some of his childhood expenses survive from his time as a hostage. He first entered royal service in 1286 and, in 1291, he succeeded his father as baron. He continued in royal military service, serving in Scotland as well as in Wales. Protracted disputes over his lands embroiled him throughout his life and at the end of his life helped spark a revolt against King Edward II of England's favourites, the Despensers. He married twice, and his heirs were his daughter Aline and his grandson John de Bohun.

== Family and early life ==
Braose was the son of William de Braose, 1st Baron Braose and his first wife, Aline, daughter of Thomas de Multon. He was likely born around 1260, as his age was given as about 46 in 1307. Other events prove that he was born prior to 1264, as he was captured in that year. This came about during the Second Barons' War (1264–1267) during the reign of King Henry III of England, as the elder Braose had sided with the king during Simon de Montfort's rebellion. The younger Braose was a hostage in the custody of Montfort's wife, Eleanor. Her household accounts include expenses related to the younger William's care.

Sometime around 1285, Braose confirmed grants of land by his ancestors to the religious house of Sele Priory. (Note: The charter is reproduced in an English translation as charter number 56 in Salzman's edition of the cartulary of Sele Priory.) In 1286 Braose was in the king's service, for unspecified duties overseas. It is possible that these included accompanying the king, Edward I, to Paris, where Edward performed homage to the new French king, Philip IV, for Edward's French lands. Braose played a significant role in King Edward's Welsh wars. In the winter of 1287–1288, he commanded the force blockading Emlyn castle. His men also provided the escort for the transport of a huge siege engine from Dryslwyn to Emlyn. The arrival of the engine, with 480 great stones as ammunition, persuaded the defenders of the castle to surrender peaceably.

== Marcher Baron ==
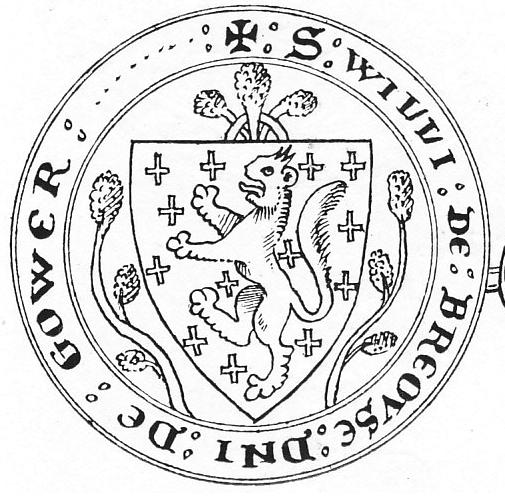
Line drawing of de Braose's seal, from a document of 1301

The younger Braose succeeded his father before 1 March 1291, when he did homage for his father's lands. He received custody of his father's lands on 2 March 1291, which had been placed into the custody of Robert de Tibetot on 12 January 1291. He was summoned a number of times to Parliament from 1291 until 1322 as Baron Braose. He was the second Baron Braose, as well as Lord of Gower and Lord of Bramber.

After his father's death, Braose continued to serve Edward. He contributed both money and personal military service in Edward's wars in Wales, Scotland, and France. He saw service in Gascony in 1294. In 1297, he took part in a military campaign in Flanders. As a reward for his service in Flanders, he received the wardship of John de Mowbray, whom Braose eventually married to his daughter Aline. From 1298 to 1306, he was involved in the Scottish wars, and was at the Battle of Falkirk on 22 July 1298. Besides the military service, he served the king in 1301 by signing a letter from the leading barons of England to Pope Boniface VIII in which the barons decried papal interference in the royal rights of England.

Braose captured the Welsh rebel William Cragh in 1290, whose miraculous resurrection after being hanged was attributed to Thomas de Cantilupe. This led in 1307 to Braose giving testimony to papal commissioners inquiring into the events surrounding Cragh's hanging and whether or not it would support the canonisation of Cantilupe.

It was most likely Braose who commissioned a condensed copy of the Domesday Book, now in the Public Record Office as manuscript E164/1. This copy has a marginal notation of "Br" next to the estates owned by Braose's ancestor, the first William de Braose.

Braose was embroiled in a dispute over his lordship of Gower in 1299 when the Bishop of Llandaff, John de Monmouth, brought a case against Braose to the king. Although the case was adjudicated in 1302, the resulting decision was overturned. In 1304, Braose secured King Edward's confirmation of earlier grants and charters granting Braose special rights and liberties in Gower. He managed this because he was serving the king in Scotland at the time, and thus had easy access to the king. In 1305, however, Braose miscalculated and insulted a royal judge, using "gross and contumelious words" to describe the royal official. This episode caused the case of Gower to be reopened in 1306, and Braose was only able to settle the issue again by the grant of rights to his men in Swansea and Gower.

In 1320, King Edward II of England confiscated the lordship of Gower on the grounds that Braose had given it to his son-in-law, Mowbray, without royal permission. Over the preceding years, Braose had promised Gower to a number of persons, including Humphrey de Bohun, the Earl of Hereford, Hugh Despenser the Younger, and Roger Mortimer of Wigmore. Mowbray then, in late 1319, took custody of Gower to protect his rights. Despenser persuaded the king in 1320 to take Gower into royal hands in October, and was appointed keeper of the honour in November.

The other lords in the Welsh Marches resented this seizure, feeling that the king's excuse for it was not applicable. The seizure was one of the precipitating causes of the baronial rebellion that led to the exile of the Despensers in 1321. In 1322, Gower was given to the younger Despenser again, who then traded it for the honours of Usk and Caerleon. Braose was then induced to sue the new holder of Gower for the return of the barony in April 1324, which action succeeded in June 1324. Braose then promptly gave Gower to the elder Despenser, returning the property to the Despenser family once more. The lordship of Gower eventually ended up in the hands of the Beauchamp family, but it was not until the 1350s that the issue was decided.

== Marriage, death, and legacy ==
The name of Braose's first wife was Agnes, but her family is not known. His second wife was Elizabeth, the daughter and heiress of Raymund de Sully. He had two daughters with his first wife, but no children with his second wife, who outlived him. It appears that there was a son named William, who was the subject of a military summons from King Edward in 1311, but nothing further is mentioned of him after 1315. In 1316, a settlement of William the father's estates made no mention of this son, making it likely that the son died before this date.

Braose died not long before 1 May 1326 and his heirs were his daughter Aline and his grandson John de Bohun. Aline, the elder daughter, married John de Mowbray and Richard de Peschale. The second daughter, Joan, married James de Bohun and Richard Foliot, son of Jordan Foliot. Mowbray received the lands of Gower and Bramber before Braose's death.

Braose was known as a man often in debt and as being unable to manage his finances effectively. Thomas Walsingham stated in his chronicle that Braose was "very rich by descent but a dissipater of the property left to him".

== Citations ==
Peerage of England
Preceded by William de Braose	Baron Braose; 1291–1326	Abeyant
