= William de Braose, 1st Baron Braose =

13th-century Anglo-Norman baron

William de Braose
- Baron Braose
- Other titles: Lord of Bramber, Lord of Gower
- Born: c. 1224
- Died: before 6 January 1291; Findon, Sussex
- Noble family: House of Braose
- Spouses: Aline, daughter of Thomas de Multon; Agnes, daughter of Nicholas de Moels; Mary, daughter of Robert de Ros
- Issue: William de Braose, 2nd Baron Braose, Giles de Braose, Richard de Braose, Peter de Braose, Margaret de Braose, William de Braose (possible)
- Father: John de Braose
- Mother: Margaret, daughter of Llywelyn the Great

Arms attributed to William de Breouse in the Camden Roll, ca 1280, blazoned there as "de azur od un leun rampant de or crusile d'or"

William de Braose, (alias Breuse, Brewes, Brehuse, Briouze, Brewose etc.; c. 1224–1291) was the first Baron Braose, as well as Lord of Gower and Lord of Bramber.

== Family and early life ==
Braose was the son of John de Braose, the Lord of Bramber and Gower and John's wife Margaret, the daughter of Llywelyn the Great, prince of Gwynedd. These members of the Braose family were all descendants of William de Braose, who died around 1093 and was the Domesday tenant of Bramber. His family had its origins at Briouze in Normandy.

Braose's father was dead in 1232, before 18 July, when William became lord of his father's properties. William came of age before 15 July 1245, making his birth around 1224.

== Lord and baron ==
He served King Henry III of England and Henry's son Edward I as a councilor and in various councils. He sided with King Henry against Simon de Montfort during the civil war in England in the later part of Henry's reign.

Braose was a benefactor of Sele Priory, with surviving charters recording the grant of a large estate in Crockhurst, Sussex to the priory in 1254. The charter was dated 4 January 1254, and was in exchange for 10 marks as an annual rent from the priory. Another charter records the gift of land near the road from Chichester to Bramber that was made at the urging of his mother Margaret. Other benefactions included gifs of rents and two small gifts of land. Around 1280, Braose released the priory from performing certain customary services and rents that it had previously paid to him and his ancestors. (Note: The charter recording this grant stated it was because the inhabitants of the priory in the past "at our request have often taken care of our young horses and have brought up young hounds or harriers for us".)

== Marriages, death, and legacy ==
Braose married three times. His first wife was Aline, daughter of Thomas de Multon. His second was Agnes, daughter of Nicholas de Moeles. His third wife was Mary, daughter of Robert de Ros. He died at Findon in Sussex shortly before 6 January 1291. He was buried at Sele Priory in Sussex on 15 January.

Braose's son, William de Braose, 2nd Baron Braose, by his first wife, succeeded him. By his second wife, he had a son Giles, who was knighted and fought in Scotland in 1300. By his third wife, William had at least three children – Richard, Peter, and Margaret (wife of Ralph de Camoys, 1st Baron Camoys) – and possibly a fourth – William. Richard was dead before 9 February 1296, and Peter died before 7 February 1312.

== Citations ==
Peerage of England
New creation	Baron Braose c. 1290–1291	Succeeded by William de Braose
