= Reginald de Braose =

English noble

Arms of Reginald de Braose

Reginald de Braose (19 September 1182 – June 1228) was one of the sons of William de Braose, 4th Lord of Bramber and Matilda, also known as Maud de St. Valery and Lady de la Haie. Her other children included William and Giles.

The de Braoses were loyal to King Richard I but grew in power under King John of England. The dynasty was in conflict with King John towards the end of his reign and almost lost everything.

Reginald de Braose was a scion of the powerful Marcher family of de Braose, helped manage its survival and was also related by marriage to the Welsh Princes of Wales.

== Magna Carta ==
He supported his brother Giles de Braose in his rebellions against King John. Both brothers were active against the King in the Barons' War. Neither was present at the signing of Magna Carta in June 1215 because at this time they were still rebels who refused to compromise.

== Restoration of royal favour ==
King John acquiesced to Reginald's claims to the de Braose estates in Wales in May 1216. Reginald became Lord of Brecon, Abergavenny, Builth and held other Marcher Lordships but was also very much a vassal of the Welsh leader Llewelyn Fawr, Prince of Gwynedd who had become his father-in-law in 1215 when Reginald married Llywelyn's daughter, Gwladus Ddu.

King Henry III restored Reginald to favour and the Bramber estates (confiscated by King John) in 1217.

== Welsh wars ==
At this seeming betrayal, Rhys and Owain, Reginald's Welsh nephews who were princes of Deheubarth, were incensed and took Builth, except the castle. Llywelyn Fawr also became angry and his forces besieged Brecon. Reginald eventually surrendered to Llewelyn and gave up Seinhenydd (Swansea).

By 1221 they were at war again, with Llewelyn again laying siege to Builth. The siege was relieved by King Henry III's forces. From this time on Llewelyn tended to support the claims of Reginald's nephew John de Braose concerning the de Braose lands in Wales.

Reginald was a witness to the re-issue of Magna Carta by King Henry III in 1225.

He died two or three years later in 1227 or 1228 in Brecon and was succeeded by his son by his first wife, Graecia Briwere (or Brewer), daughter of William Brewer. He was buried in Brecon Priory Church (now Brecon Cathedral).

Reginald and Graecia had a son, William de Braose, who was executed by Llewellyn Fawr, King of Gwynedd, upon being caught in the bedchamber of Joan, Lady of Wales.

It may be that the Matilda de Braose who was the wife of Rhys Mechyll, Prince of Deheubarth was the daughter of Reginald.

== See also ==
- House of Braose

== Related Source ==
- Complete Peerage, G. E. Cokayne, Vol 1 pp 21–22 for the family of Reginald
