= Juhel de Totnes =

Soldier and supporter of William the Conqueror

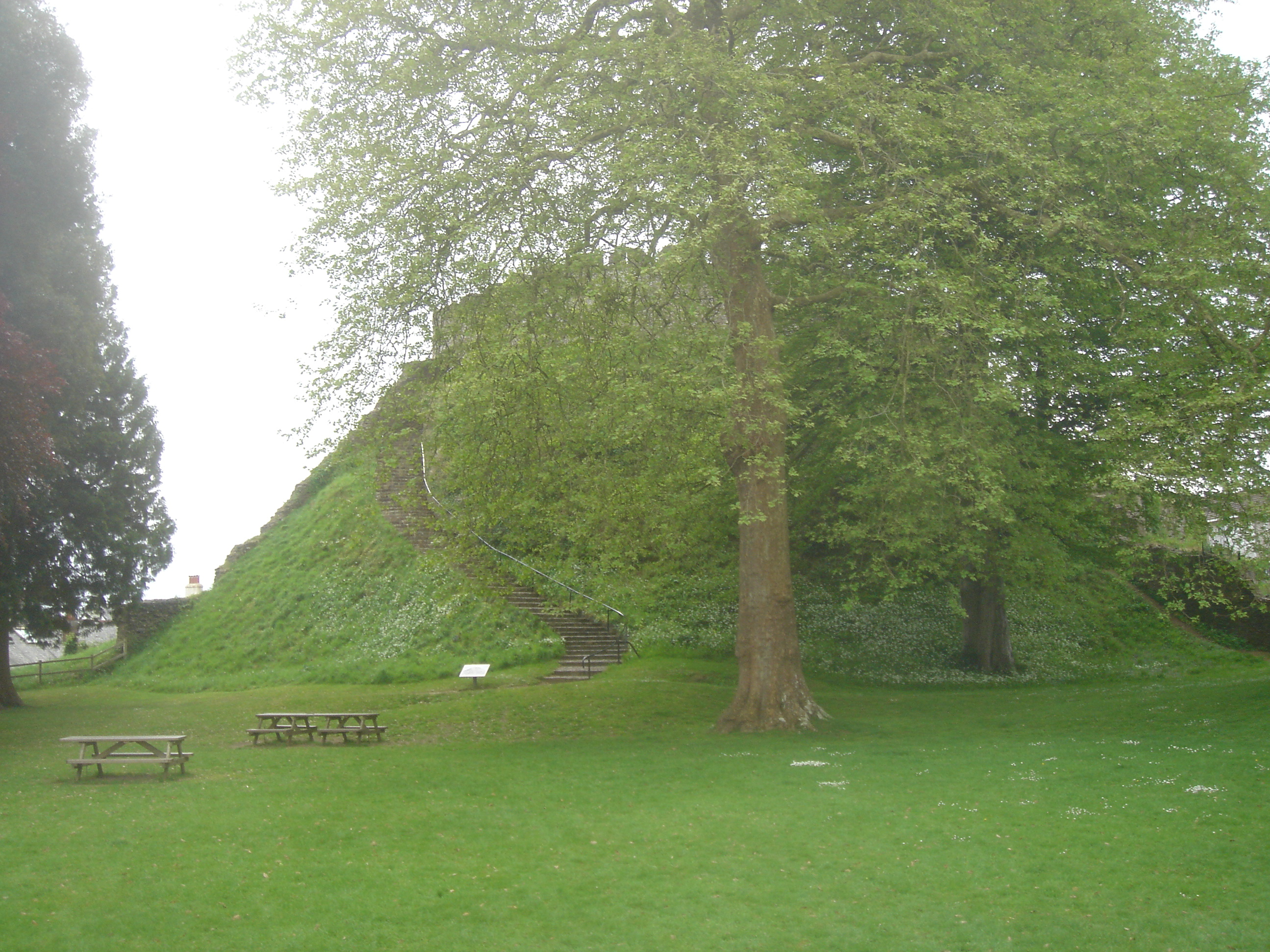
Totnes Castle

Juhel de Totnes (died 1123/30) (alias Juhel fitz Alfred, Juhel de Mayenne, Judel, Judhel, Judael, Judhael, Joel, Judhel de Totenais), Latinised to Judhellus filius Aluredi, "Juhel son of Alured") was a soldier and supporter of William the Conqueror (1066–1087). He was the first feudal baron of Totnes and feudal baron of Barnstaple, both in Devon.

== Origins ==
He originated either in Brittany or in Mayenne, in the Pays de la Loire/Maine, as his surname of de Mayenne given in an early charter suggests. He was the son of a certain Alfred, Latinised to Aluredus, expressed in Anglo-Norman French as fitz Alfred (i.e. Latin filius, modern French fils de, "son of"). He had a brother named Robert (Latin: Rotbertus) named in the foundation charter of Totnes Priory, c. 1087.

== Career ==
In 1069 Juhel was one of the leaders of the Breton forces on the Norman side, fighting against the remaining forces that had been loyal to King Harold. He had been granted by William the Conqueror the feudal barony of Totnes, Devon, and held many manors in south-west England, at the time of the Domesday Book of 1086, including Clawton, Broadwood Kelly, Bridford and Cornworthy. However, Barry Cunliffe names him as one of two Breton noblemen who held land in England prior to Norman Conquest.

In about 1087, he founded Totnes Priory. He was expelled from the barony of Totnes shortly after the death of King William I in 1087. According to the historian Frank Barlow (1983), King William II "replaced the Breton Judhel, whom he expelled from Totnes at the beginning of his reign for an unknown reason, with his favourite, Roger I of Nonant". However at some time before 1100 Juhel was granted the large feudal barony of Barnstaple, Devon.

== Progeny ==
Juhel had two daughters; also a son named Alfred who died without progeny before 1139. Alfred's two sisters, one of whom was called Aenor while the name of the other is unknown, were his co-heiresses, each inheriting a moiety of the barony of Barnstaple. The unnamed sister married Henry de Tracy whilst Aenor married Philip de Braose (d. 1134/55), feudal baron of Bramber, Sussex and a Marcher Lord. son of William I de Braose (d. 1093/6). In 1206 Juhel's great-grandson William III de Braose (1140/50–1211) regained control of half the barony of Totnes.

== Death ==
Juhel was still living in 1123 but had died before 1130.
