= Philip de Braose =

Anglo-Norman noble

- Lord of Bramber
- Born: c. 1070
- Died: c. 1134 possibly on crusade in the Levant
- Noble family: House of Braose
- Spouses: Aenor de Totnes, daughter of Juhel of Totnes
- Issue: William de Braose, 3rd Lord of Bramber, Philip de Braose junior, Basilia (daughter), Gilian (daughter)
- Father: William de Braose, 1st Lord of Bramber

Philip de Braose, 2nd Lord of Bramber (c. 1070 – c. 1134) was an Anglo-Norman nobleman and Marcher Lord.

== Origins ==
Philip was born about 1070 to 1073, the son of William de Braose, 1st Lord of Bramber (d. c. 1093/96) by his wife Eve de Boissey or Agnes de St. Clare. William de Braose had participated in the Norman conquest of England. He had been rewarded with the feudal barony of Bramber in Sussex and smaller holdings in Dorset, Wiltshire, Berkshire and Surrey.

== Career ==
As heir, Philip consolidated his paternal lands, and expanded them by conquering Builth and New Radnor, in the Welsh borderlands, and establishing new Norman lordships over them. He acquired the lordship of Totnes (Devon) through his wife. He supported Henry I against Robert of Normandy, but in 1110 revolted against Henry, his estates being confiscated. He regained possession in 1112 and after 1130, the estates passed to his eldest son, William de Braose, 3rd Lord of Bramber. Philip constructed a motte-and-bailey fortification at the site where King Edward I later built Builth Castle in the 13th century.

== Marriage and children ==
He married Aenor de Totnes, sister and co-heiress of Alfred de Totnes (d. pre-1139), son of Juhel de Totnes (d. 1123/30), feudal baron of Totnes (which he forfeited c.1087) and of Barnstaple, both in Devon. In right of his wife Aenor, Philip acquired a moiety of the feudal barony of Barnstaple, the other moiety of which was held by Henry de Tracy (d. pre-1165), Aenor's brother-in-law. He had the following children:

- William de Braose, 3rd Lord of Bramber, his eldest son and heir
- Philip II de Braose
- Basilia, a daughter
- Gillian, a daughter

== Death ==
He died between 1131 and 1139, possibly in 1134 on crusade in the Levant.

== See also ==
- House of Braose
