= Petronilla de Grandmesnil, Countess of Leicester =

English countess (died 1212)

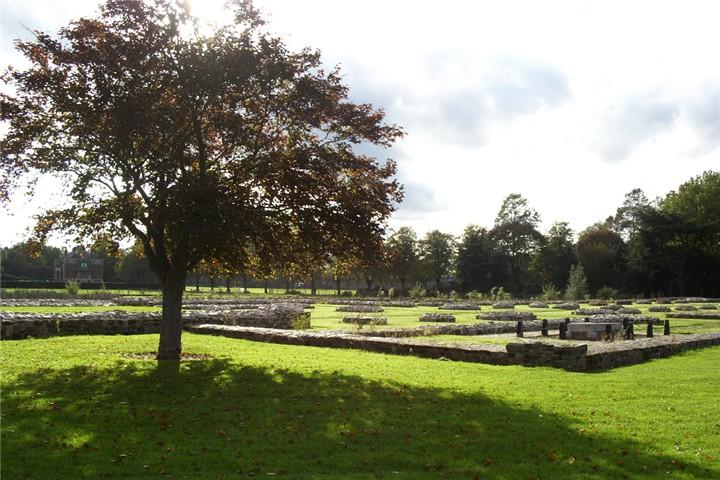
Leicester Abbey ruins

Petronilla de Grandmesnil, Countess of Leicester (c. unknown– 1212) was the wife of Robert de Beaumont, 3rd Earl of Leicester, known as "Blanchmains" (d. 1190). After a long widowhood, she was buried in Leicester Abbey after her death on 1 April 1212.

The chronicler Jordan Fantosme wrote that Earl Robert and his wife Petronilla were participants in the 1173–1174 rebellion of Henry "the Young King" against King Henry II, his father. Jordan claimed that Earl Robert participated because of grievances against King Henry and credits dismissive remarks about the English who were fighting on the king's side to the countess: "The English are great boasters, but poor fighters; they are better at quaffing great tankards and guzzling." Countess Petronilla accompanied her husband on his military campaign against English troops under the command of the earl of Arundel and Humphrey III de Bohun. During the final showdown, she is said to have fled from the battle, only to be found in a ditch:

"The earl’s wife wanted to drown herself, when Simon of Odell saw to pulling her out: ‛My lady, come away from this place, and abandon your design! War is all a question of losing and winning."

She was noted as wearing male armour when captured. She was wearing a mail hauberk with a sword and a shield. Earl Robert was also captured and his holdings were confiscated. Countess Petronilla was released and during the earl's continued imprisonment he wrote to her asking that she discharge the bequests stated in his father's will.

== Family ==
Petronilla de Grandmesnil, the daughter of William de Grandmesnil, is stated by Sanders (1960) to have been the great-granddaughter and heiress of Hugh de Grandmesnil (1032–1098), feudal baron of Leicester and one of the proven Companions of William the Conqueror known to have fought at the Battle of Hastings in 1066. However her father's position within the Grandmesnil family is not agreed by all historians. She married in the mid-1150s and bore at least seven children:

- William (d. before 1190)
- Robert de Beaumont, 4th Earl of Leicester, "FitzParnel/FitzPetronilla" (d. 1204) married Loretta de Braose
- Roger, Bishop of St. Andrews (d. 1202)
- Amice married (1) Simon de Montfort (d. 1188); parents of Simon de Montfort, 5th Earl of Leicester

(2) William de Barres (d. 3 Sept. 1215)

- Margaret married Saer de Quincy, later 1st Earl of Winchester
- Hawise, who became a nun at Nuneaton Priory
- Pernel/Petronilla
- Two additional children are possible: Geoffrey and Mabel
