= William de Braose (bishop) =

Welsh bishop (d. 1287)

William de Braose (died 1287) was a bishop of Llandaff, now in modern-day Cardiff, Wales.

== Dynastic family background ==
A member of the great, long-lived and at times very powerful de Braose family of Norman and medieval English Marcher Lords, some of whom held key posts and vital Lordships in the Welsh Marches, this William de Braose was destined for a life in the Church.

== Bishop of Llandaff ==
He procured the diocese of Llandaff in 1266, being consecrated on 23 May in that year.

He was bishop of Llandaff from 1266 to 1287; the Lady Chapel at Llandaff Cathedral was built during his bishopric and his tomb is on the north side of the altar there.

== See also ==
- House of Braose

Catholic Church titles
Preceded by William de Radnor	Bishop of Llandaff; 1266–1287	Succeeded by Philip de Staunton
