= William de Braose, 4th Lord of Bramber =

Lord of Bramber (died 1211)

William de Braose
- 4th Lord of Bramber
- Other titles: Lord of Gower, Abergavenny, Brecknock, Builth, Radnor, Kington, Limerick, Glamorgan, Skenfrith, Briouze in Normandy, Grosmont and White Castle
- Died: 9 August 1211; Corbeil, Kingdom of France
- Buried: Abbey of Saint-Victor, Paris, Kingdom of France
- Noble family: House of Braose
- Spouse: Maud de Braose
- Issue: William de Braose, Giles de Braose, Bishop of Hereford, Reginald de Braose, Matilda (also called Maud) de Braose, Margaret de Braose, Lady of Trim, Annora de Braose, Loretta de Braose, John de Braose, Flandrina de Braose, Abbess of Godstow
- Father: William de Braose, 3rd Lord of Bramber
- Mother: Bertha of Hereford

Arms attributed to this William de Braose by Matthew Paris (see Aspilogia II, MP IV No7)

William de Braose, (or William de Briouze), 4th Lord of Bramber (1144/1153 – 9 August 1211), court favourite of King John of England, at the peak of his power was also Lord of Gower, Abergavenny, Brecknock, Builth, Radnor, Kington, Limerick, Glamorgan, Skenfrith, Briouze in Normandy, Grosmont, and White Castle.

== Lineage ==
William was the most notable member of the de Braose dynasty. His steady rise and sudden fall at the hands of King John is often taken as an example of that king's arbitrary and capricious behaviour towards his barons.

William was the son of William de Braose, 3rd Lord of Bramber and his wife Bertha of Hereford, also known as Bertha de Pitres (born c. 1130), daughter of Miles Fitz Walter, Earl of Hereford and his wife, Sibyl, daughter of Bernard de Neufmarché. From his father, he inherited the Rape of Bramber, in Sussex, and through his mother, he inherited a large estate in the Welsh Marches area of modern-day Monmouthshire.

== Abergavenny Massacre ==
In 1175, William de Braose carried out the Abergavenny Massacre, luring three Welsh princes and other Welsh leaders to their deaths. His principal antagonist was a Seisyll ap Dyfnwal, of Castell Arnallt near Llanover in the valley of the River Usk near Abergavenny, whom he blamed for the death of his uncle Henry.

After having invited the Welsh leaders to a Christmas feast at Abergavenny Castle under the pretence of peace and the start of a new era at the end of the year (a traditional time for settling outstanding differences amongst the Welsh), he had them murdered by his men. This resulted in great hostility against him among the Welsh, who named him the "Ogre of Abergavenny".

Gerald of Wales exonerates him and emphasises the religious piety of de Braose and his wife and de Braose generosity to the priories of Abergavenny and Brecon. William de Braose did however reputedly hunt down and kill Seisyll ap Dyfnwal's surviving son, Cadwaladr, a boy of seven.

In 1192, William de Braose was made sheriff of Herefordshire, a post he held until 1199. In 1196 he was made Justice Itinerant for Staffordshire. In 1195 he accompanied King Richard I of England to Normandy and in 1199, William de Braose fought beside Richard at Châlus, where the king was mortally wounded. He then supported King John's claim to the throne of England, and represented the new king, making various royal grants.

== The disappearance of Arthur I, Duke of Brittany ==
In 1203, William de Braose was put in charge of Arthur of Brittany, (Note: Arthur of Brittany was John's nephew and was seen by many as the rightful heir to the English throne.) whom he had personally captured the previous year at the Battle of Mirebeau. William was suspected of involvement in Arthur's disappearance and death, although no concrete evidence ever came to light. There is somewhat better evidence that he at least knew the truth of the matter. William was in attendance with John in Normandy at the time of Arthur of Brittany's imprisonment and it was alleged that Arthur suffered the same fate as the Welsh princes at William's hand, although this has never been proven. Arthur's death remains a mystery. After Arthur disappeared, De Braose served in the war of 1204 against King Philip II of France in France.

== Royal favourite ==
He was greatly favoured by King John early in his reign. John granted him all that he might conquer from the Welsh in Radnorshire, gave him lordship over Limerick in Ireland (save for the city itself), possession of Glamorgan castle, and the Lordship of Gower with its several castles.

In early 1200, King John deprived Theobald Walter, 1st Baron Butler of all his offices and lands in Ireland because of his irregularities as sheriff. His lands were not restored until January 1202. A manuscript in the National Library of Ireland points to William as the agent of his restoration:

"Grant by William de Braosa (senior), to Theobald Walter (le Botiller) the burgh of Kildelon (Killaloe) ... the cantred of Elykaruel (the baronies of Clonlisk and Ballybritt, County Offaly), Eliogarty, Ormond, Ara and Oioney, etc. 1201."

"Elykaruel" refers to the Gaelic tuath of "Ely O'Carroll", which straddled the southern part of County Offaly and the northern part of Tipperary (at Ikerrin). The other cantreds named are probably the modern baronies of Eliogarty, Ormond Upper, Ormond Lower, and Owney and Arra in County Tipperary.

Before 1206 William successfully claimed half of the barony of Totnes from Henry de Nonant, to which family it had been granted after its forfeiture from Juhel de Totnes.

In 1206, after his service in France, King John gave William de Braose the three great neighbouring trilateral castles of Gwent (Skenfrith Castle, Grosmont Castle and White Castle). These have been interpreted as bribes encouraging silence on the demise of Arthur, seen by many as a rightful heir to the throne occupied by John of England.

At this point, only an earldom separated him from the greatest in England.

== Royal persecution and death in exile ==
Coat of arms attributed to William as it appears in Cambridge, Corpus Christi College, Parker Library MS 16 II (Chronica Majora). The arms are inverted to signify William's death.

Soon after this, William de Braose fell out of favour with King John of England. The precise reasons remain obscure. King John cited overdue monies that de Braose owed the Crown from his estates, but the king's actions went far beyond what would be necessary to recover the debt. He distrained (seized) de Braose's English estates in Sussex and Devon, and sent a force to invade Wales to seize the de Braose domains there. Beyond that, he sought de Braose's wife, Maud de St. Valery, who, the story goes, had made no secret of her belief that King John had murdered Arthur of Brittany. (Note: Gerald of Wales describes Maud as a 'prudent and chaste woman' who bore her husband three sons William, Giles and Reginald de Braose.)

De Braose fled to Ireland, then returned to Wales as King John had him hunted in Ireland. In Wales, William allied himself to the Welsh Prince Llywelyn the Great, and helped him in his rebellion against King John.

In 1210, William de Braose fled Wales disguised as a beggar, to France. His wife and eldest son were captured. William died the following year in August 1211 at Corbeil, France. He was buried in the Abbey of St. Victor in Paris by a fellow exile and vociferous opponent of King John, Stephen Langton, the Archbishop of Canterbury. His hopes to return alive to Wales and for burial in Brecon were to be unfulfilled. William's wife, Maud, and eldest son, William, once captured, were allegedly murdered by King John, possibly starved to death while incarcerated at Windsor Castle and Corfe Castle in 1210.

While William had aroused the jealousy of the other barons during his rise, the arbitrary and violent manner of his fall very probably discomfited them and played a role in the Baronial uprisings of the next decade. The historian Sidney Painter, in his biography of King John, called it "the greatest mistake John made during his reign, as the King revealed to his Barons once and for all his capacity for cruelty."

== The de Braose lineage ==
William de Braose's eldest son, William, married Maud (Matilda) de Clare (ca. 1184–1213), the daughter of Richard de Clare, 3rd Earl of Hertford. This younger William was captured with his mother and starved to death in 1210. He had fathered four sons, John, Giles, Philip and Walter and although they were also held in prison, they were released in 1218. John, the eldest, was said to have been brought up secretly, in Gower, by a Welsh ally or retainer. On his release, he came under the care of his uncle Giles de Braose. John made a claim to being the rightful heir of the de Braose lands and titles and although the courts did not find for him, his other uncle Reginald de Braose was able to cede by a legal convention the barony of Bramber to him for a fee. This established John's branch of the family and positioned it for survival at least or, at best, an opportunity for continued future power and influence.

== Later dynasty ==
The middle son, Giles de Braose, exiled in France until 1213, was Bishop of Hereford from 1200 until his death in 1215. He made peace with King John and agreed terms for regaining de Braose lands in 1215 but had also made alliances with the Welsh leader Llywelyn the Great. He died in 1215 before he could come into the lands.

William's third son, Reginald de Braose reacquired his father's lands and titles for himself by simply seizing them back by force following the death of Giles. Reginald did not actually come to terms with the Crown until 1217 and the new, young King Henry III of England, after the death of King John. This, in turn, aroused the anger of Llywelyn the Great who had an understanding with Giles de Braose and the seeming duplicity caused the Welsh to attack de Braose lands in Brecon and Abergavenny and Gower. Abergavenny Castle had to be rebuilt as a result. Reginald de Braose died in 1228.

William's eldest daughter Matilda/Maud married a prominent Welsh prince, Gruffydd ap Rhys II of Deheubarth.

Another daughter, Margaret, married Walter de Lacy, Lord of Meath in Ireland and himself another powerful Marcher Lord. [There seems to be some confusion with Matilde about who her father is re Professor Thomas Jones Pierce, M.A., F.S.A., (1905–1964), Aberystwyth. she is the daughter of William Braose and Bertha Hereford, the father of this William].

== Sources ==
- Altschul, Michael (2019). A Baronial Family in Medieval England: The Clares, 1217-1314. Johns Hopkins University Press.
