= Lordship of Gower =

Welsh medieval marcher lordship

Coordinates: 51.620°N 4.137°W

Lordship of Gower Arglwyddiaeth Gŵyr
- c. 1116–1536
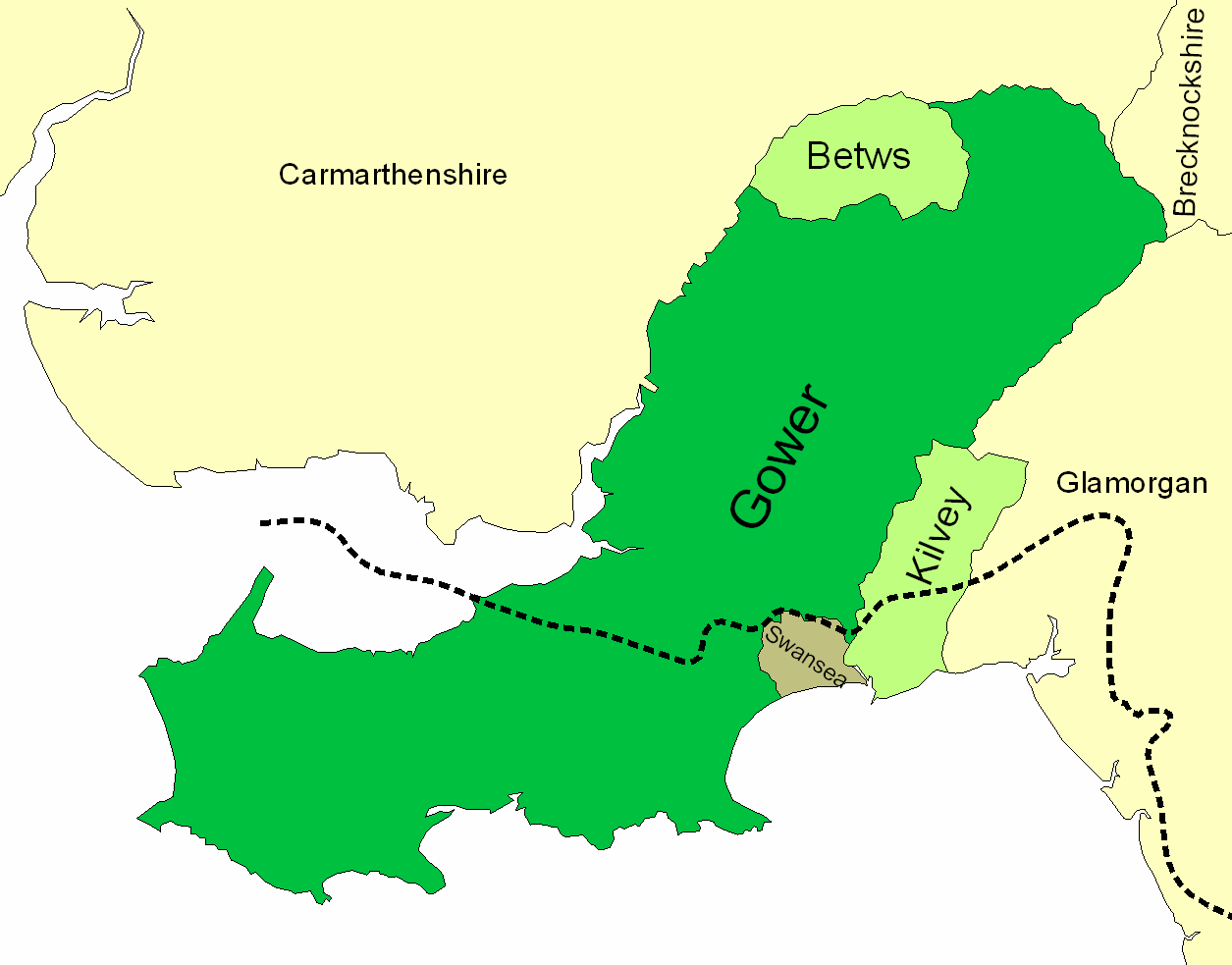
- Map of the Lordship, showing the area detached (Betws), the area added (Kilvey Lordship) and the Town and Franchise of Swansea. The language boundary is shown as a dotted line.
- Status: Client state of the Kingdom of England
- Capital: Swansea
- Lord
  - 1158 - 1184: William de Newburgh
  - 1331 - 1354: John, Lord Mowbray
  - 1492: Somerset Lord Herbert
- Historical era: Middle Ages
  - Conquered by the Normans: c. 1116
  - Annexation by Henry VIII: 1536
Preceded by	Succeeded by
Glywysing; Deheubarth	Kingdom of England

Gower was an ancient marcher lordship of Deheubarth in South Wales.

== Creation of Lordship ==
Prior to the Norman invasion, the district was the commote of Gŵyr, a part of Cantref Eginawc, within the realm of Deheubarth. Over the preceding century, Deheubarth had been contested between the heirs of Maredudd ab Owain's brother Einion (such as Rhys ap Tewdwr), those of his daughter Angharad (such as Gruffydd ap Llywelyn), and the rulers of Morgannwg. Gruffydd was the only person to ever have been King of Wales.

In 1088, the sons of Bleddyn ap Cynfyn, Gruffydd's half-brother, attacked Deheubarth, which was then ruled by Rhys ap Tewdwr. Though Rhys eventually recovered his position, with Irish assistance, he later overstretched himself attacking Gruffydd's son-in-law's son-in-law, Bernard de Neufmarché, who had now established himself as Lord of Brecknock; Rhys was killed in the battle.

Following the death of William Rufus, in 1100, the throne was contested between King Henry I (based in England), and his elder brother Robert Curthose (based in Normandy). In 1102, Robert of Bellême launched an invasion against Henry, in support of Curthose; the surviving sons of Bleddyn provided support to Bellême's invasion. Henry, however, persuaded Bleddyn's son Iorwerth to change sides, by gifts, and the insinuation that Iorwerth would be given Norman backing to rule Eginawc; this is one of the reasons the invasion failed.

However, King Henry instead granted Eginawc to Hywel ap Goronwy, a leading member of the army of Iorwerth's brother, Cadwgan. Though Hywel originated in Maelienydd as a descendant of Elystan Glodrydd, (supposedly his great-grandson), he also had the highly advantageous quality that he was the grandson of Angharad, the maternal granddaughter of Maredudd ab Owain (as well as, supposedly, being a descendant of Tudwal the Lame).

In 1106, following Hywel's murder, King Henry split Eginawc, granting the lordship of Gower to Henry de Beaumont, the man who had persuaded the barons to accept Henry (rather than Robert Curthose) as successor to William Rufus; the Lordship of Kidwelly was given to Bishop Roger of Salisbury, at that time a deeply trusted ally. Henry de Beaumont built Swansea Castle, to serve as the base of the Lordship. Soon afterwards, the southern part of the Gower peninsula was colonised by English speakers, and was formally divided into Welsh Gower and English Gower.

== Physical description ==
The Lordship consisted of the country bounded by the rivers Loughor, Amman, Twrch and Tawe. Its caput and chief castle was Swansea, and it extended westward to the end of the Gower Peninsula and northward to Ystalyfera and Gwaun-Cae-Gurwen.

== Braose Lords ==
When Henry de Beaumont's grandson, Waleran, got heavily into debt, King John (1199–1216) took the Lordship away from him, in part settlement. In 1203, John transferred the Lordship of Gower to William III de Braose (d. 1211) for the service of one knight's fee. The charter, dated 23 February 1203 (4 John), was transcribed by G. T. Clark from a Public Record Office manuscript (P.R.O., Q.R., Miscell. Books, vol. I) and published in his Cartae, vol. 2, charter no. 283, pp. 287–88, under the title "Grant by King John of the whole land of Gower, with its boundaries, to William de Braose":

Johannes Dei gracia Rex Anglie Dominus Hibernie, Dux Normannie, Aquitannie et Comes Andegavie: Archiepiscopis, episcopis, abbatibus, comitibus, baronibus, justiciaribus, vicecomitibus, ballivis et omnibus ministris et fidelibus suis, salutem. Sciatis nos dedisse concessisse et presenti carta nostra confirmasse dilecto et fideli nostro Willelmo de Braosa totam terram de Guher cum omnibus pertinenciis suis in Wallia. Habendam et tenendam sibi et heredibus suis de nobis et heredibus nostris per servicium unius militis pro omne servicio. jure volumus et firmiter precipimus quod predictus Willelmus de Braoso et heredes sui post ipsum habeant et teneant totam predictam terram de Guher cum omnibus pertinenciis suis in Wallia de nobis et heredibus nostris per predictum servicium sicut predictum est bene et in pace libere et quiete integre plenarie et honorifice cum omnibus libertatibus et liberis consuetudinibus suis in omnibus locis et omnibus rebus ad predictam terram pertinentibus. Hiis testibus: Baldewino comite Albemarlie; Willelmo de Humet, constabulario Normannie; Radulpho Tacone, tunc senescallo Normannie; Roberto de Harecurt; Hugone de Gornaco; Johanne de Pratellis; Petro de Stokes. Datum per manum Hugonis de Well' apud Rothomagum . xxiii die Februarii anno regni nostri quarto.

Added below is the following writing in Norman-French, with marginal title — Ija chartre de la terre de Goulier. E les bundes . dc ineime la terre. (Charter of the Land of Gower and its boundaries...):

Logherne va desques a Amman e parte la terre de Govhek e la terre de OARNEWALDHAr . Amman parte parentre Gtouher e Iskennyn et le Commod p'uED desques a Lleuenedh. E Lleueneth desques a Claudhoweyn. E Claud- HOVFEVN desques a Tourthe. Tourthe departe entre Gtouher et la terre de

Breckeneu desques a Tawy. Tawy departe entre Gouher e la terre le coimte de Gloucestrie desques a Aber Gleys . [De] Gleys . desques a MEYNHiRYON . De Meynhirion . desques a Crimelyn . De Crimelyn . desques a Pulcanan . De Pulcanan desques a Neth . desques a la Meek . et cetera.

The parish of Betws was detached from the lordship in the 13th century. The remainder of the Lordship continued with the Braose family until the death of William de Braose, 2nd Baron Braose in 1326, who had no surviving sons.

== Subsequent history ==
William de Braose decided to settle the inheritance while he still lived, dividing his lands between his daughters, Aline and Joan. The Lordship of Gower went to Aline (the eldest), and her husband John de Mowbray. At the same time, William attempted to sell the lands to Hugh Despenser, the Lord of Glamorgan, so the king attempted to confiscate the land, triggering an insurrection against himself by a number of barons; Mowbray, naturally, was one of them. Mowbray, however, was captured and executed for treason, and Aline (and her son) were imprisoned. It was not until the king died, in 1327, following a coup, that she was able to recover the Lordship.

At the end of the 14th century, Thomas de Mowbray, 1st Duke of Norfolk, Aline's then successor, became Duke of Norfolk (though he was later banished, but not attainted, for his part in the coup against Richard II by the Lords Appellant). Following the death of Thomas' grandson, John Mowbray, 3rd Duke of Norfolk, his lands were entrusted to the care of William Herbert, the Earl of Pembroke, on account of the young age of John's son (and heir). Already hugely wealthy and powerful, in 1468 the Duke was content to convert Herbert's custody of Gower into permanent possession, which the king confirmed the following year.

However, in 1479, King Edward IV forced Herbert's incompetent son (who was unable to control his feuding tenants), to surrender his lands, and titles, in exchange for the Earldom of Huntingdon; the former lands and titles - including the Lordship of Gower - were granted to Edward's son, Prince Edward, instead. Ironically, Edward's brother, Richard of Shrewsbury, had married Mowbray's heir and successor, Anne de Mowbray, 8th Countess of Norfolk.

When Edward IV died, however, and his brother Richard III usurped Prince Edward's claim to the throne, the Earl of Huntingdon was one of Richard III's supporters, and was duly rewarded by regaining partial authority over his former lands, as Justiciar of South Wales. Following Richard's defeat at the Battle of Bosworth Field (at which Herbert was not present), Herbert lost his office, but being well connected - his wife was the aunt of Elizabeth of York, Henry VII's Queen - he was allowed to remain a mere landlord of the land. Nevertheless, Herbert's daughter, and sole heir, married the Earl of Worcester, becoming a Countess.

== Abolition and absorption by Glamorgan ==
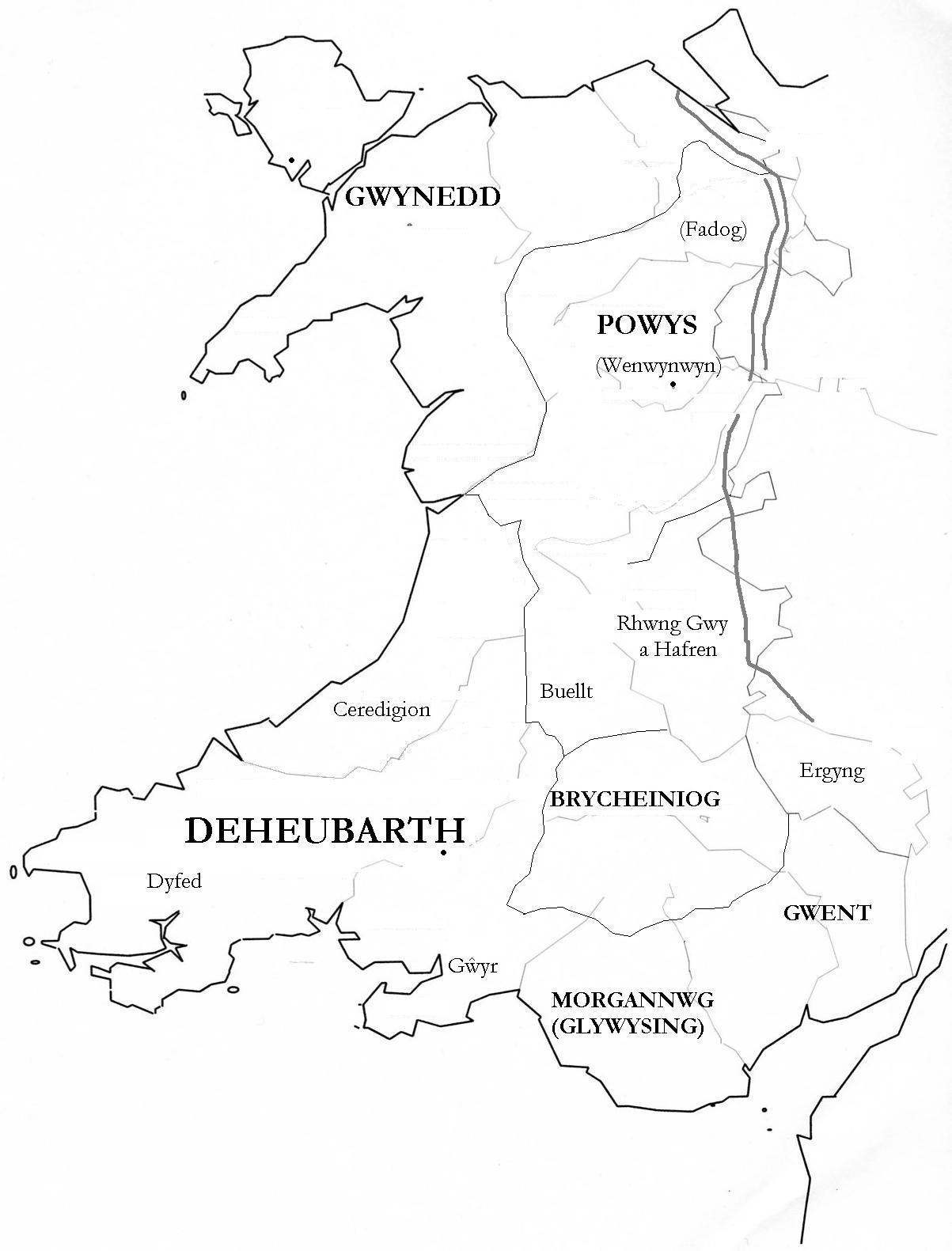

The Lordship was formally extinguished by the son of Elizabeth and Henry - Henry VIII - by his first Laws in Wales Act (1535), which merged it with the Lordship of Glamorgan, an area which similarly had been forfeit for allegiance to Richard III, and which, when previously held by the crown - in the time of Hugh Despencer - had been combined with Gower. The Act converted the combined area into a county - Glamorgan. Nevertheless, the Gower area (except for the parish of Bishopston - historically dependent on Llandaff) remained part of the Diocese of St Davids until the Diocese of Swansea and Brecon was formed in 1923.

The traditionally Welsh-speaking part of Gower in the north-east, along with the Barony of Kilvey (roughly, the parish of Llansamlet on the east bank of the Tawe, formerly in the Lordship of Glamorgan), became the Hundred of Llangyfelach, while the traditionally English-speaking south-western part became the Hundred of Swansea.

Though the rights of Marcher lords were abolished by the Laws in Wales Act, considerable claimed rights and privileges continued to be exercised de facto in Gower by the Earls of Worcester (who eventually became Dukes of Beaufort), who still remained substantial landlords in the Gower area for many centuries. In Gabriel Powell's 1746 Survey of Gower, the still substantial rights claimed by then Lord (Henry Somerset, 5th Duke of Beaufort), are described in detail

== Modern era ==
The name of the area has continued in use since 1885 in the name of the parliamentary constituency which consists of all the lordship other than Swansea city, but today the name Gower is often incorrectly applied only to the Gower Peninsula.

The medieval division between English and Welsh-speaking areas continues. The peninsula and the coastal part of Swansea are mainly English-speaking and more Welsh is spoken to the north; Ystalyfera and Gwaun-Cae-Gurwen remain bastions of the Welsh language. The boundary shown on the map is that of D T Williams (1931). It had changed little in several centuries.
