= Giles de Braose =

13th-century Bishop of Hereford

- Bishop of Hereford
- Appointed: about 19 September 1200
- Term ended: 17 November 1215
- Predecessor: William de Vere
- Successor: Hugh de Mapenor

Orders
- Consecration: 24 September 1200

Personal details
- Born: before 1176
- Died: 17 November 1215 Worcester
- Buried: Hereford Cathedral

Giles de Braose (or Giles de Bruse; died 17 November 1215) was Bishop of Hereford from 1200 to 1215.

== Early life ==
Giles was the second son of William de Braose, 4th Lord of Bramber. His father was a landholder on the Welsh Marches, who gained the favour of King John of England in the early years of John's reign. Giles' mother was Maud of St Valery. His education and early career are unknown, but he was likely born soon after 1170.

== Bishop of Hereford ==
Giles was elected as Bishop of Hereford on about 19 September 1200 and consecrated on 24 September 1200, at Westminster. The cathedral chapter had previously attempted to elect Walter Map, but the death of King Richard I of England prevented Map's election. He owed his election to his father's position with the king, and continued to receive gifts and grants from the king for the next four years. He was also granted custody of the castle of Bishop's Castle in southern Shropshire.

Giles was probably responsible for the building of the tower of Brecon Cathedral. He may also have then been responsible for the building of the tower of Hereford Cathedral as his alabaster effigy can be seen there today.

Over 50 documents from Giles' time as bishop survive, which show him to have had a good knowledge of canon law. He was often employed by the papacy as a judge-delegate, hearing cases referred back to England from Rome. Since Hereford was on the Welsh Marches, Giles was involved in the politics and disputes of the border lands, including a dispute between King John and Gwenwynwyn ab Owain of Powys, which was resolved around 1204.

== Troubles with John ==
In late 1206 John appointed a new sheriff of Herefordshire, who appears to have put pressure on both Braoses, father and son. Giles may have been a hostage for his father's behaviour in April and May 1208, before escaping and going into exile in France in late May 1208. While he was in exile, he joined a group of other English exiles who were trying to get aid from King Philip II of France against John. Giles' mother and elder brother were starved to death in 1210 on John's orders, and this probably increased his distrust and dislike of John. Giles aided Llywelyn ab Iorwerth's efforts to make an alliance with King Philip, which bore fruit in 1212.

== Return to England ==
Giles was able to return to England in 1213, where he was at first on good terms with John, who restored some lands to him. The bishop, however, was concerned that the lands of his nephews, the sons of his elder brother William, were not returned to them, and in May 1214 efforts to find a compromise with the king failed. John then confiscated some of the bishop's lands and granted them to another. This led Giles to join the barons opposing John, and in conjunction with the Welsh leader Llywelyn the Great, to raze Hugh de Mortimer's castle at Wigmore, Herefordshire. Hugh was the lone marcher baron to side with John. In October 1214, the marcher lords and John were reconciled, and Giles rejoined the royal court. After Llywelyn's revolt in May 1215, Giles and his brother Reginald de Braose seized their ancestral lands and the bishop himself took a number of the castles. In October 1215, Giles was reconciled with the king, and paid a fine of 9,000 marks to assure his possessions.

It appears that in 1215, Giles had custody of his father's lands, along with his nephew John, (Note: John was the son of Giles' brother William.) as in March of that year a fine was recorded against Giles for the custody of the estates, and on 10 May 1215 a writ was issued allowing him to have the case judged. However, while Giles returned to the king's faction by the autumn of 1215, Reginald did not.

Giles died 17 November 1215, at Worcester and is buried in Hereford Cathedral.

== See also ==
- House of Braose

== Citations ==
Catholic Church titles
Preceded by William de Vere	Bishop of Hereford; 1200–1215	Succeeded by Hugh de Mapenor
