= William de Braose, 1st Lord of Bramber =

Norman nobleman and warlord

William de Braose
- Lord of Bramber
- Other titles: Lord of Briouze, Normandy
- Died: 1093–1096
- Noble family: House of Braose
- Spouse: Agnes de St. Clare
- Issue: Philip de Braose

William de Braose (or William de Briouze), First Lord of Bramber (died 1093/1096) was previously lord of Briouze, Normandy. He participated in the Norman Conquest of England and was granted lands by William the Conqueror, including the feudal barony of Bramber. His descendants played a significant part in the subsequent power struggles in England, Wales and Ireland in the 11th to 14th centuries.

== Norman victor ==
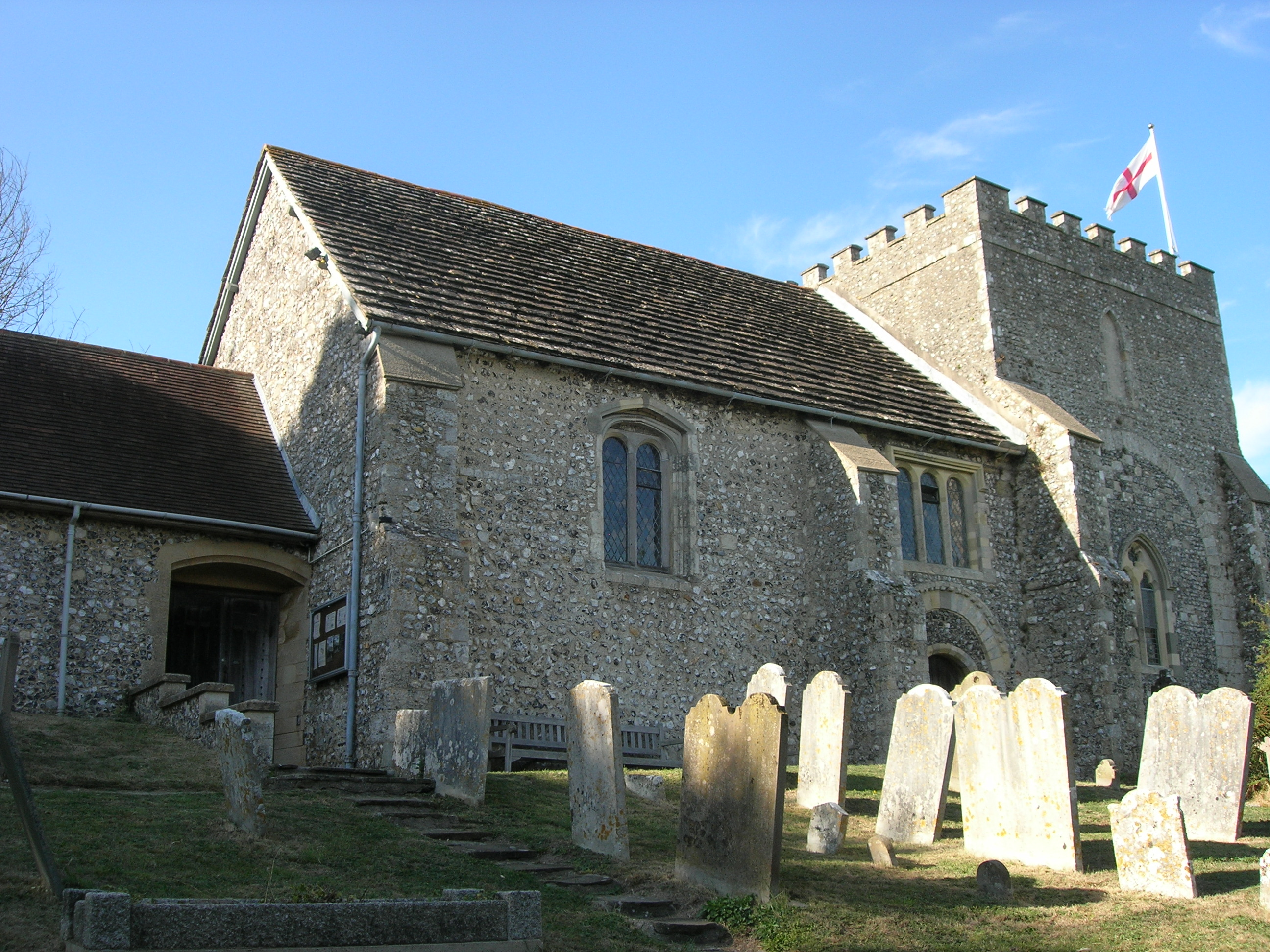
The early Norman church at Bramber was at the centre of a dispute between William de Braose and Fécamp Abbey in Normandy.

Braose had been given extensive lands in Sussex by 1073. He became feudal baron of the Rape of Bramber where he built Bramber Castle. Braose was also awarded lands around Wareham and Corfe in Dorset, two manors in Surrey, Southcote in Berkshire and Downton in Wiltshire. He became one of the most powerful of the new feudal barons of the early Norman era.

He continued to bear arms alongside King William in campaigns in England, and Normandy and Maine in France.

He was a pious man and made considerable grants to the Abbey of Saint Florent, in Saumur, Normandy, and endowed the foundation of priories at Sele near Bramber and at Briouze.

He was soon occupying a new Norman castle at Bramber, guarding the strategically important harbor at Steyning. He began a vigorous boundary dispute and power struggle with the monks of Fécamp Abbey in Normandy to whom William the Conqueror had granted Steyning.

== Land disputes ==
Braose built a bridge at Bramber and demanded tolls from ships travelling further along the river to the busy port at Steyning. The monks challenged this, and they also disputed Braose's right to bury people in the churchyard of his new church of Saint Nicholas at Bramber, demanding the burial fees for themselves, despite the church's having been built to serve the castle and not the town. The monks then produced forged documents to defend their position and were unhappy with the failure of their claim on Hastings, which was very similar. They claimed the same freedoms and land tenure in Hastings as King Edward the Confessor had given them at Steyning. On a technicality, King William was bound to uphold all rights and freedoms held by the abbey before King Edward's death, but the monks had already been expelled ten years before that. William wanted to hold Hastings for himself for strategic reasons, and he ignored the problem until 1085, when he confirmed the abbey's claims to Steyning but compensated it for its claims at Hastings with land in the manor of Bury, near Pulborough in Sussex.

In 1086, King William called his sons, barons, and bishops to court (the last time an English king presided personally, with his full court, to decide a matter of law) to settle the Steyning disputes, which took a full day. The result was a decision in favor of the abbey. William de Braose was forced to curtail his bridge tolls and give up encroachments onto the abbey's lands, including a farmed rabbit warren, a park, burgage tenements, and a channel used to fill his moat. Braose also had to organise an exhumation of all Bramber's dead, the bodies being transferred to the abbey's churchyard of Saint Cuthman in Steyning.

== Progeny ==
William de Braose was succeeded as Lord of Bramber by his son, Philip de Braose, starting an important Anglo-Norman dynasty (see House of Braose).

== Death ==
William de Braose was present in 1093 at the consecration of a church in Briouze, Normandy. However, his son Philip was issuing charters as Lord of Bramber in 1096, indicating that William de Braose died sometime between 1093 and 1096.
