= St Nicholas' Church, Bramber =

St Nicholas' Church
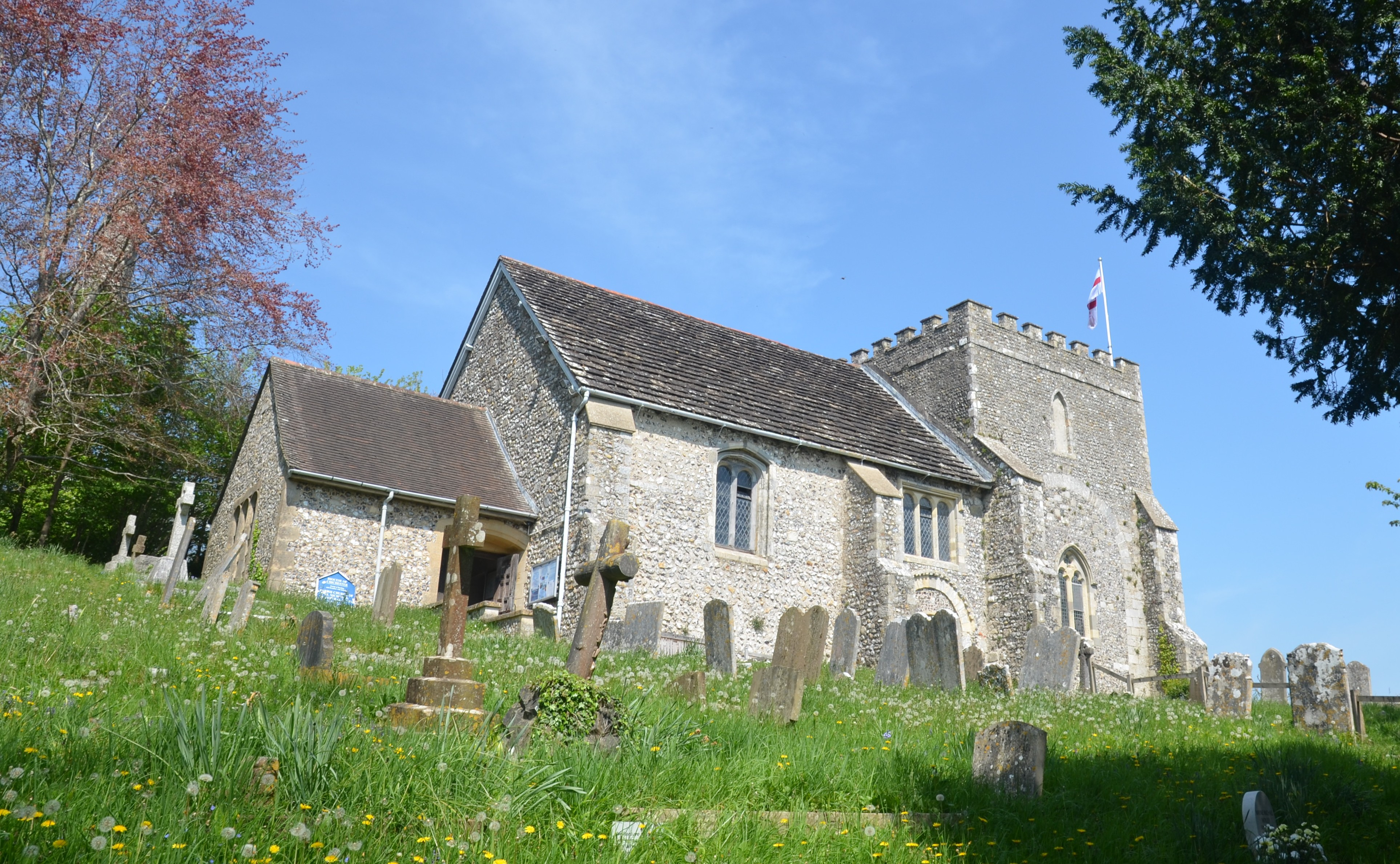
- St Nicholas' Church
- 50°52′58.440″N 0°18′55.109″W
- Address: The Street, Bramber, Steyning, West Sussex, BN44 3WE
- Country: England
- Denomination: Church of England
- Website: www.3bschurch.org.uk

History
- Status: Parish church
- Founded: c. 1073
- Dedication: Saint Nicholas

Architecture
- Architectural type: Collegiate church
- Style: Norman

Specifications
- Materials: Flint rubble and freestone

Administration
- Archdiocese: Canterbury
- Diocese: Chichester
- Archdeaconry: Chichester
- Deanery: Storrington
- Parish: Beeding and Bramber with Botolphs

Clergy
- Priest: Neill Stannard

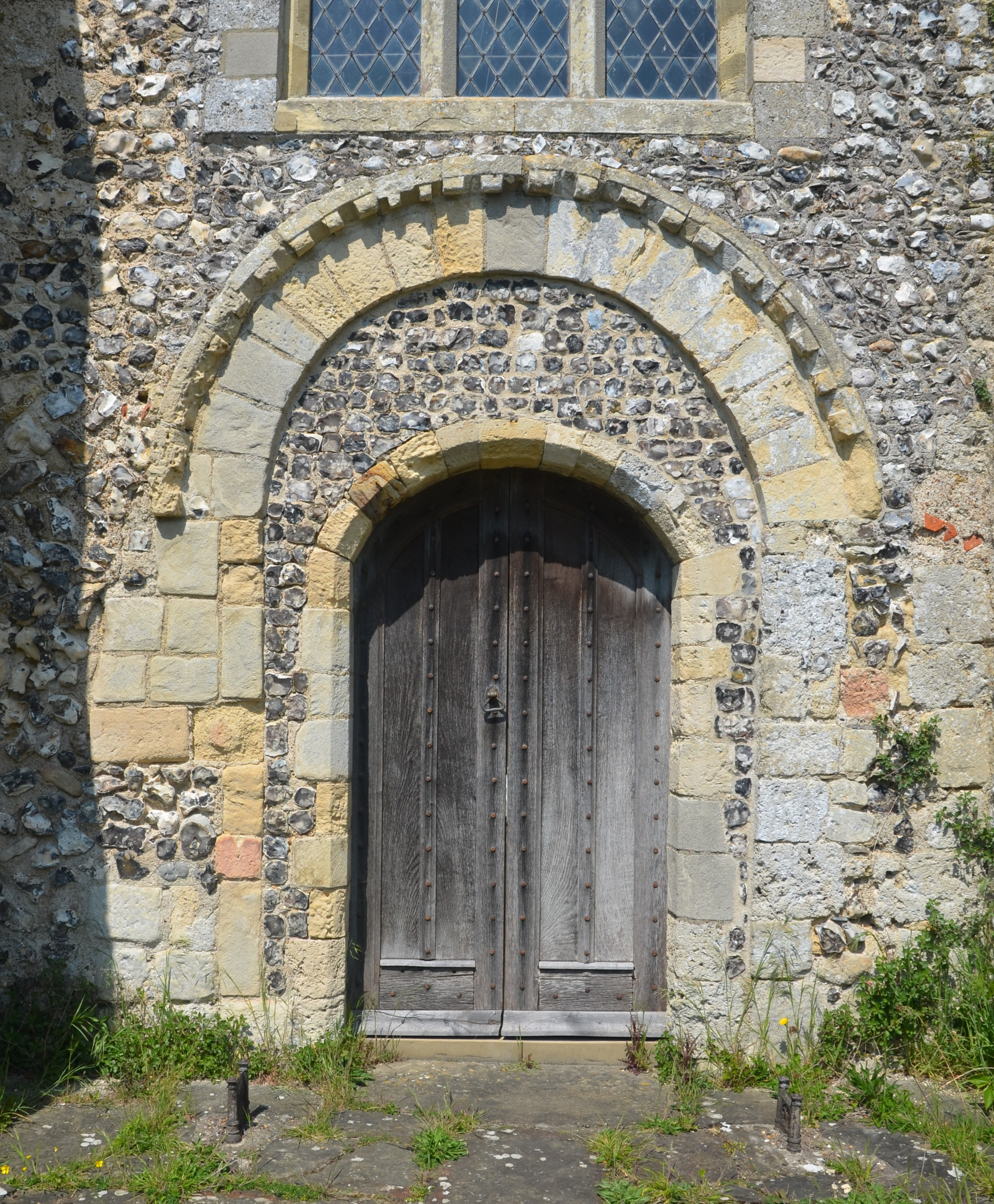
The south doorway

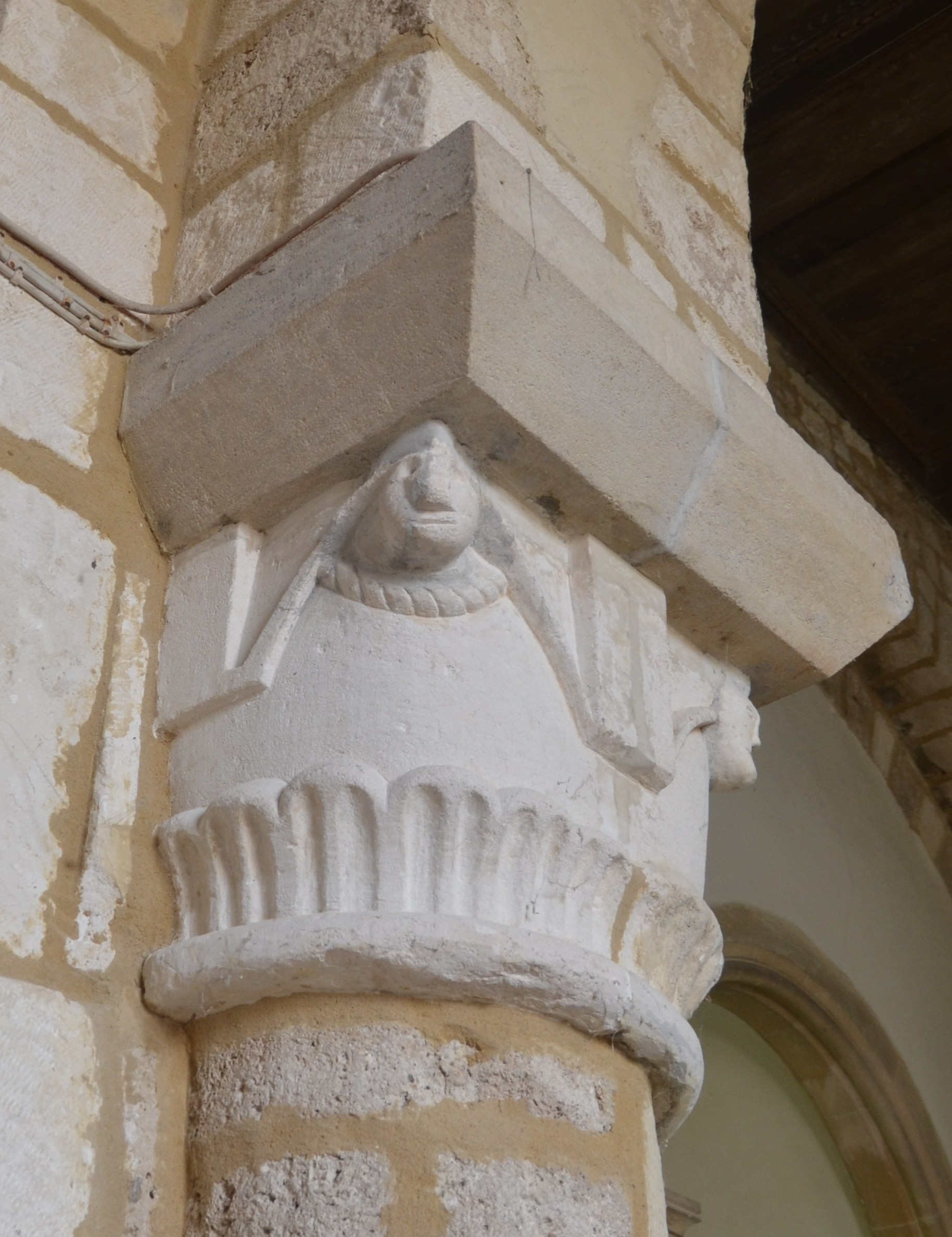
North capital of the crossing arch

St Nicholas' Church, Bramber is a Church of England parish church in the village of Bramber, West Sussex. Dating back to approximately 1073, the fabric of the church is still mainly Norman though with some rebuilding and restoration work from the 18th, 19th and 20th centuries. It is particularly notable for some rare examples of early Norman sculpture on the capitals of the chancel arch.

Its parish is now combined with those of St Peter's, Upper Beeding and St Botolph's, Botolphs to form a united benefice. English Heritage has listed St Nicholas' Church at Grade I for its architectural and historical importance.

== History ==
There was no settlement at Bramber until the Norman Conquest, when William de Braose, having been granted the lordship of the Rape of Bramber, built a castle on high ground above the Adur estuary and instituted the borough of Bramber by the side of the river. Around the year 1073 he also established a collegiate church, St Nicholas' Church, close to the castle — so close, indeed, that an outwork of the castle may have enclosed it. Originally this was a small cruciform church with a semicircular apse, though by the 13th century this last had been replaced by a rectangular chancel. The church lay at that time in the parish of Steyning, which had been granted to Fécamp Abbey in Normandy. William had by 1080 made over his own church to the Abbey of Saint-Florent, Saumur in Normandy, and attempted to create a new parish of Bramber of which his own foundation would be the parish church. Thus began a hard-fought struggle with Fécamp Abbey. In 1086 William the Conqueror personally decided in favour of Fécamp, and ruled that all bodies buried in Bramber churchyard for the past 13 years should be exhumed and reburied at St Cuthman's Church in Steyning. The burials suggest that, whatever its official status, St Nicholas had been functioning as a parish church as well as the castle's chapel. A similar attempt in 1094–1096 to give it parochial rights also failed. The dispute eventually reached a compromise settlement by which Saumur Abbey relinquished their claims on behalf of Bramber in return for parochial rights being granted to St Peter's Church at Upper Beeding. By 1096 the college at St Nicholas had been dissolved, and later documents call it a chapel; nevertheless, at some time before about 1250 it finally succeeded in being recognised as a parish church.

Bramber's prosperity, moderate even in the High Middle Ages, declined seriously during the early 1300s, and the village remained impoverished until the 19th century. The poverty of the district was responsible for the union of Bramber and nearby Botolphs into one united benefice, a measure proposed in the 1480s and effected in 1526. The fabric of St Nicholas' Church suffered along with its congregation. The north arm of the transept had already been demolished in the 14th century, and the south arm in the 15th; the chancel of the church was described as "sum what ruinos" in 1602. Local myth notwithstanding, there is no reason to think that any of the church's dilapidation was due to Civil War damage, nor that it was then used as a gun emplacement to attack the castle. At a bishop's visitation in 1724 the church was reported to remain in poor condition; and in 1761 it was said that nothing was roofed except the nave.

Matters were finally taken in hand when the Rev. Thomas Green became rector of Bramber in 1783. He had the ruinous chancel demolished and the tower rebuilt, using stone from Bramber Castle, over the crossing, which thereafter served as a chancel. Further work was done through the 19th century. In 1818 the church was ceiled; around 1840 the crossing, now a chancel, was repaired; in 1871 the walls were decorated in a Byzantine style and the east window rebuilt in a Norman style; and in 1890 further restoration work was done. In 1931 the architect W. D. Caröe added a vestry at the west end of the church and a lych-gate, and redecorated the interior of the church. Further repair work was undertaken in 1959–1960 by John Leopold Denman.

In 1897 the united benefice was extended to include Upper Beeding. On 15 March 1955 the church was given Grade I listed building status, indicating that it is "of exceptional interest".

=== Living and patronage ===
The living was valued at 10 marks (a mark being worth two thirds of a pound) in 1291, rising to £10 6s. 8d. for the united benefice in 1535 and to £45 in 1724. The advowson of the church passed from Saumur Abbey to Sele Priory in Upper Beeding, then from 1484 to c. 1953 was held by Magdalen College, Oxford. It finally passed to the Bishop of Chichester. Between 1582 and 1937 all rectors of Bramber were Magdalen alumni, mostly former fellows of the college. A glebe house in Bramber survived until some date between 1664 and 1724, after which many rectors of Bramber lived at the Botolphs vicarage, or in Upper Beeding or Steyning. In 1838 Magdalen College bought a house in Bramber which they leased to incumbents as a rectory.

== Architecture and fittings ==
Much of the original Norman flint rubble and freestone fabric of the original church has survived the various demolitions and restorations, including the plain south doorway, the blocked arch in the north wall (which was presumably used as the entrance from the castle), and most notably the crossing. The crossing arches have volute capitals sculpted in a style derived from that of Bernay Abbey and of churches in Caen founded by William the Conqueror and his wife. Indeed, they may have been sculpted in Normandy. Certainly, they are entirely compatible with a date in the 1070s. They have been described as being "of special note...rare examples of early Norman carving", and as "a perfect example of late C11 work in Caen stone and of a Caen type", fashioned in a characteristically crude style. The nave is also Norman, though with later modifications. A window was put into the north wall in the 14th century, and two more in the south wall in the 16th. The upper part of the tower, as rebuilt by the Rev. Thomas Green, is no more than a shell, unroofed but crenellated for picturesque effect. The 19th-century restorations were denounced as "bungling" by the architectural critic Ian Nairn; as a result of them, he wrote, "visually, Bramber is no fun at all", however interesting it may be from the historical point of view.

There is stained glass in the three lights of the east window depicting Saint Peter, Jesus as Salvator Mundi, and Saint Nicholas. It was made by the firm of Heaton, Butler and Bayne at the time the window was remodelled in the 1870s.

The church has only one bell, made by Nicholas Rous about the year 1348. It bears the inscription IHESUS NAZARENUS REX IUDIORUM : NICOLAS ME FECIT (Jesus of Nazareth, King of the Jews: Nicholas made me).

Memorial tablets in the church include one to the Rev. Thomas Green (d. 1830) and his wife and daughter. This features a circular plaque by Eleanor Coade bearing a representation of a seated woman.

The church plate consists of a chalice, a paten, and a flagon, all silver and all hallmarked 1868.

The font is of uncertain date, having been variously assigned to the 13th century or to the late 18th/early 19th.

== Parish registers ==
The West Sussex Record Office holds the baptism registers of St Nicholas' Church from 1601 to 2005, the marriage registers from 1601 to 2012, and the burial registers from 1601 to 1709 and from 1900 to 2001. It also holds the bishops' transcripts from 1591 to 1868.

== Services ==
Services are held at St Nicholas' Church every Sunday at 8.30 a.m.
