= Rape of Bramber =

Traditional geographic subdivision in England

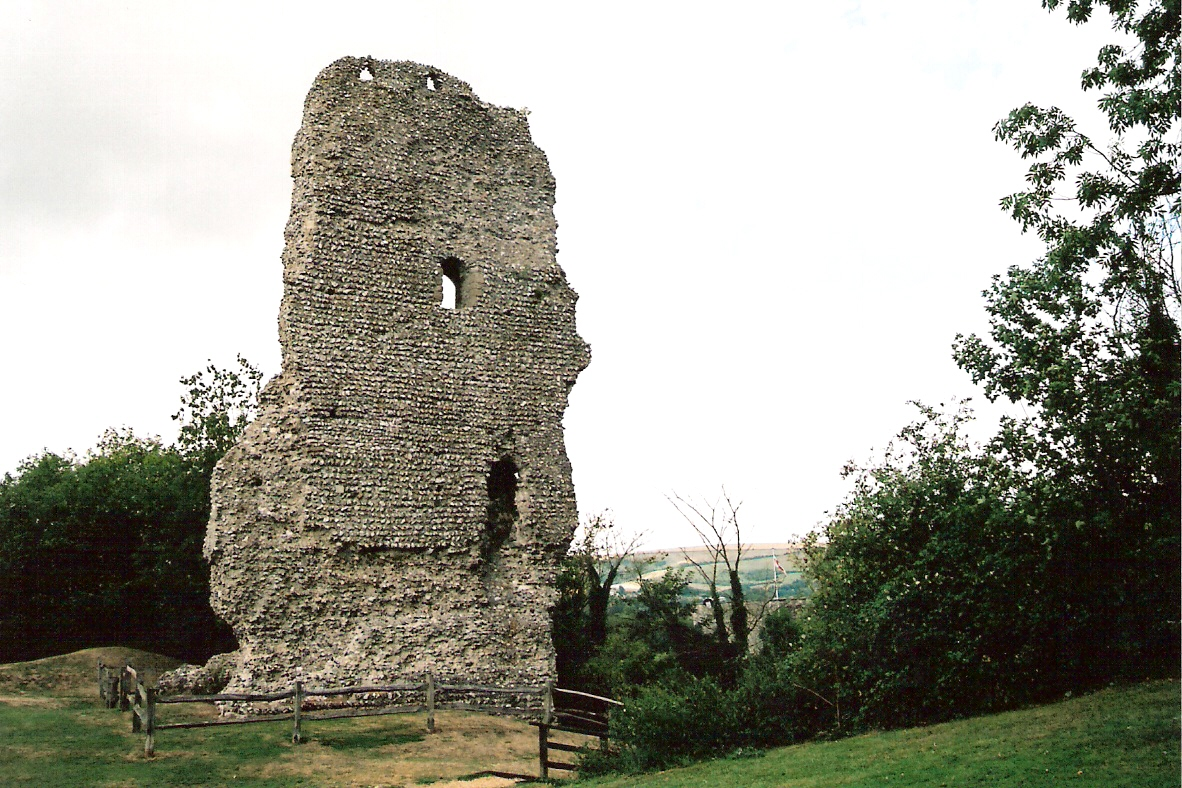
- Remains of Bramber Castle, the original administrative centre of the Rape

- The Rape of Bramber shown within Sussex
- Area
  - 1831: 116,650 acres (182.27 sq mi; 472.1 km^{2})
- Population
  - 1801: 19,203
  - 1811: 22,777
  - 1831: 30,113
- Density
  - 1831: 0.26 inhabitants per acre (170/sq mi; 64/km^{2})
- History
  - Created: 11th century
  - Succeeded by: Sussex (western division)
- Status: Rape (county subdivision)
  - HQ: Bramber
- Subdivisions
  - Type: Hundreds
  - Units: Brightford, Burbeach, West Grinstead, Poling, Singlecross, Steyning, Tarring, Tipnoak, East Easwrith (half hundred), Fishersgate (half hundred), Wyndham (half hundred)

The Rape of Bramber (also known as Bramber Rape) is one of the rapes, the traditional sub-divisions unique to the historic county of Sussex in England. It is the smallest Sussex rape by area. Bramber is a former barony whose original seat was the castle of Bramber and its village, overlooking the river Adur.

== History ==
Created by William the Conqueror in the late 11th century, the rape of Bramber was separated out of the neighbouring rapes of Arundel and Lewes and entrusted to one of his knights, William de Braose, 1st Lord of Bramber. It was inserted so William de Braose could defend the Adur estuary, and a re-allocation of land to existing rapal owners became necessary. In 1208, King John confiscated the Braose lands, taking them under royal control.

In population terms, the smallest of the three rapes making up Sussex's western division, its population in 1801 was 19,203, rising to 22,777 in 1811 and 30,113 in 1831.

== Location ==
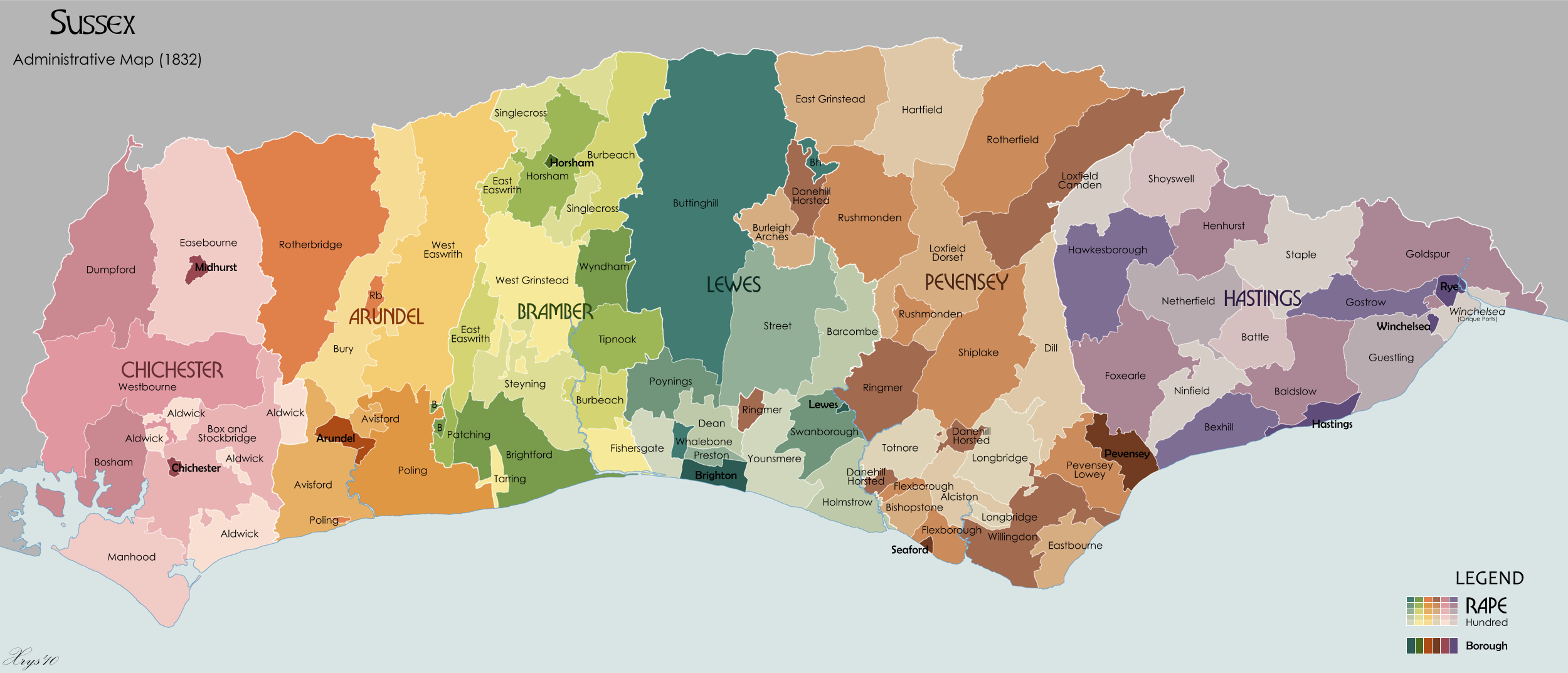
Location of Bramber within Sussex

The rape of Bramber is a strip of territory running northwards from the coast to the border with Surrey in the north. It is bordered by the rape of Arundel to the west and the rape of Lewes to the east. It contains a variety of different landscape areas – coastal plain and the mouth of the river Adur in the south, the South Downs and the Weald north of that, including the westernmost part of the dense Forest Ridge, known in the rape of Bramber as St Leonard's Forest. In the neighbouring rape of Lewes, the Forest Ridge is known as Worth Forest. The rape contains five towns: Horsham, Shoreham-by-Sea, Steyning and most of the borough of Worthing, as well as the westernmost part of the borough of Crawley. Ifield was the parish in the far north-east of Bramber rape, and in its own north-east corner on Lowfield Heath grew the County Oak, which traditionally marked the Sussex–Surrey boundary, as well as the boundary between the rapes of Bramber and Lewes. The oak was cut down in the 1840s and is remembered today in the County Oak Retail Park in Crawley. The highest point in the rape is Chanctonbury Ring at 242 metres (794 ft) tall.

== Historical population ==
Population 1801–1831
Year	Pop.	±%
1801	19,203	—
1811	22,777	+18.6%
1821	26,940	+18.3%
1831	30,113	+11.8%

== Relationship to West and East Sussex ==
Until the creation of the rape of Bramber, Sussex had been divided into east and west at the River Adur, at least for the purposes of the church in Sussex (divided from at least the 11th century into the archdeaconry of Chichester and the archdeaconry of Lewes). After the creation of the rape of Bramber, the rape became one of the three rapes traditionally making up the western division of the county of Sussex (known as West Sussex since 1888 when East and West Sussex were given their own County Councils). For around 800 years its eastern boundary with the rape of Lewes formed the boundary between the eastern and western divisions of Sussex. The Mid Sussex district was created following the Local Government Act 1972, which transferred a large part of the rape of Lewes from East Sussex to West Sussex. The rape is now organised into the borough of Worthing and the Adur district in the south, and the Horsham district in the north.

== Sub-divisions ==
The rape is traditionally divided into the following hundreds:

- Brightford
- Burbeach
- West Grinstead (Grensted in the Domesday Survey)
- Poling (once known as Rieberge)
- Singlecross
- Steyning
- Tarring (a peculier of the Archbishop of Canterbury)
- Tipnoak

as well as 3 half hundreds

- East Easwrith
- Fishersgate
- Wyndham

== See also ==
- List of hundreds of England and Wales
- Bramber Castle
- Knepp Castle
