= Chequer Inn =

Public house in West Sussex, England

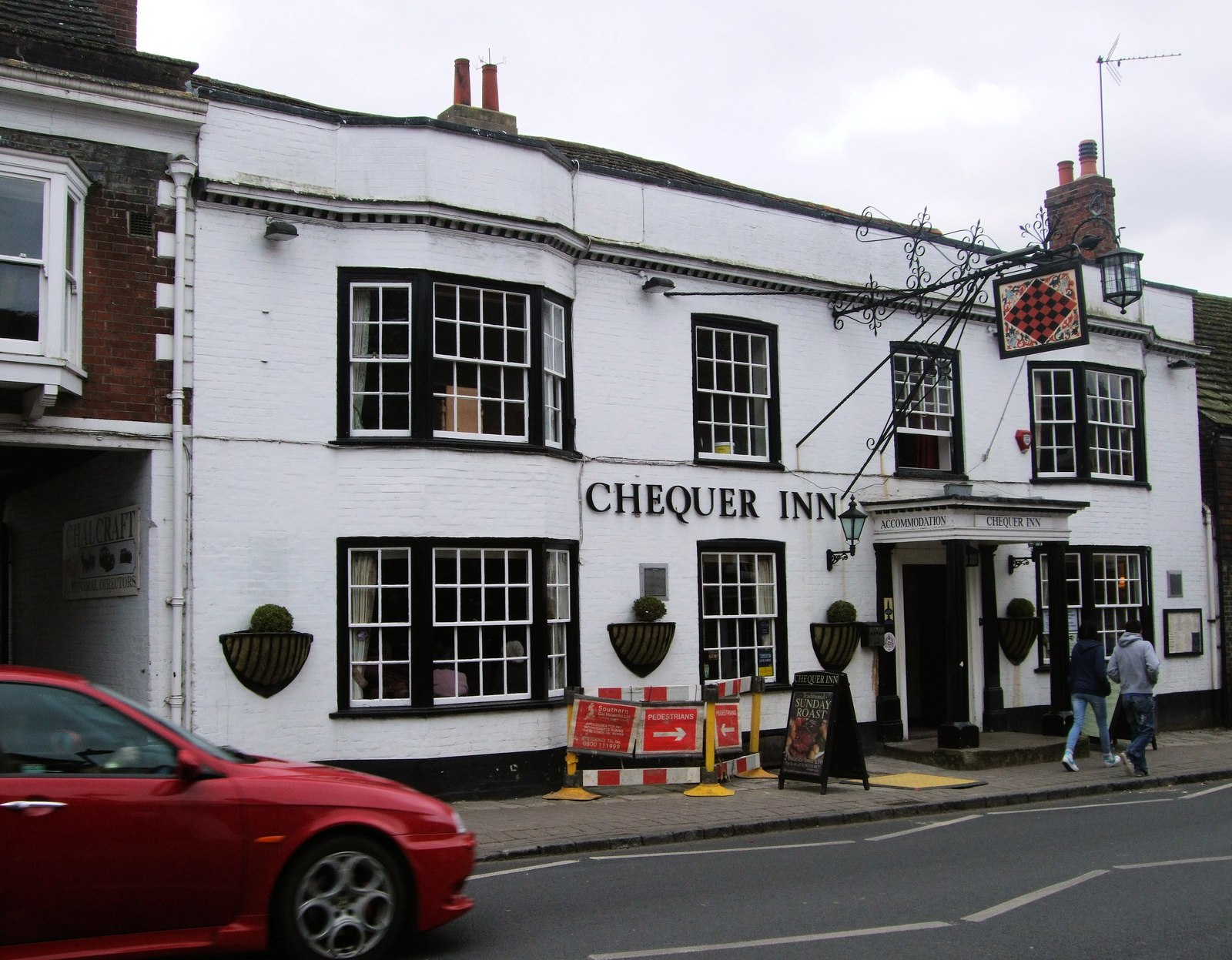

- Location within West Sussex
- 50°53′19.1″N 0°19′46.9″W
- Type: Public house
- Location: Steyning
- OS grid reference: TQ 17590 11218

History
- Built: 15th century

Site notes
- Area: West Sussex
- Architectural style: Timber framed

Listed Building – Grade II
- Official name: The Chequers Inn
- Designated: 15 March 1955
- Reference no.: 1180557

The Chequer Inn is a historic 15th Century coaching house (believed to date from around 1440) in the Conservation Area of the old market town of Steyning, in the Horsham District of West Sussex, United Kingdom. English Heritage has listed the building at Grade II for its architectural and historical importance.

== History ==
The Chequer Inn is timber-framed. The western half is a Crown post cross wing. The heavy sooting, seen on a plastered division within the roof is often an indication of a mediaeval open hall. Some decorative, combed plasterwork can also be seen. This part of the building was probably built in the 15th century, or possibly a little earlier.

Over the years, apart from supplying accommodation and a change of horses for passenger or mail coaches, the Chequer Inn also acted as a court house, prison, auction room, post office, coroner's inquest office, trading post and an important local meeting place.

In the 19th Century, the Inn had eight bedchambers, ranging from gentlemen's rooms with curtained four-post beds to the drovers' quarters containing straw beds or palliasses. About six servants also lived in the inn. There was a 25-foot mahogany dining table in the first floor dining room where meals of mutton, beef, pigeon, and pheasant were served.

== Architecture ==
The Chequer Inn has a white painted frontage comprising two splayed bays, which are timber framed and faced with mathematical tiles. The timbered, flat roofed main entrance canopy is supported by circular timber columns, built off a large Horsham Stone step. Evenly spaced sash windows and a parapet complete the main frontage. Behind the parapet is a wide back gutter serving the large hipped roof of plain tiles, and two brick chimneys. To the rear there are three pitched roof wings, connected at their bases by wide valley boards.

The building is an example of a triple bay oak timber-framed building having “daub and wattle” interior walling fitted within the oak timber frame. Only the North wing (Saloon Bar and Dining Room) of the building still retains the oak framing and original features on the ground floor. Many of the older timber-framed walls are visible upstairs.

A carriage entrance was created, probably in the 17th century, by removing the north-west ground floor of room 39 and raising the first floor. This was needed because the Chequer Inn was a coaching inn and posting house with stabling for about a dozen horses, and there would have been a busy traffic in and out of this entrance. A separate Ostlers Cottage and a horse stable block stand at the back of the Inn.

The Inn's timber-framed street frontage was destroyed when the Inn was enlarged in 1799. The addition provided extra rooms, and a brick front in keeping with 18th century fashion. The then tenant, John Stoveld the Younger, a Steyning brewer, was presented at the Manor Court of Charlton for contravention of local planning laws, in that he "made an encroachment on the High Street… Causing the Checker Inn, which hath in a great measure been rebuilt, to be brought considerably forward into the High Street." He was fined six shillings and eight pence (6s 8d) for this misdemeanor, but got away with the rebuilding.

By the end of the 18th century a Saloon was added; this was a room where for an admission fee or a higher price of drinks, singing, dancing, drama or comedy was performed and drinks would be served at the table.

The stable yard is now a car park; at one time the town fire engine was housed there.

=== Checker sign and light ===
In 1393 King Richard II created a law stating that "Whosoever shall brew ale in the town with intention of selling it must hang out a sign, otherwise he shall forfeit his ale." This was to make alehouses easily visible to passing inspectors, borough ale tasters, who would decide the quality of the ale they provided. The signs were illustrated so as to be identifiable to the mostly illiterate population. The name "The Checkers" or "The Chequers" originated from the design on the pub's sign; the design originated in ancient Rome, where a chequer board indicated that a bar also provided banking services. The checked board was used as an aid to counting and is the origin of the word exchequer. In the 17th-century, ale houses and inns were required to hang out lanterns to help illuminate the street. In Steyning the hook at the end of the Chequer sign bracket was used to support the town lamp.

== Historic references ==
In 1653 the poet, John Taylor, who had travelled from Petworth to Steyning, wrote:

August the 18, twelve long miles to Steyning
I rode, and nothing saw there worth the Kenning.
But that mine host there was a jovial Wight.
My Hostess fat and fair, a goodly sight:
The sign, the Chequer, eighteen pence to pay.
My mare eat mortal meat, good Oats and Hay.
