= Bramber Castle =

Norman castle in Bramber, West Sussex, England

- West Sussex, England
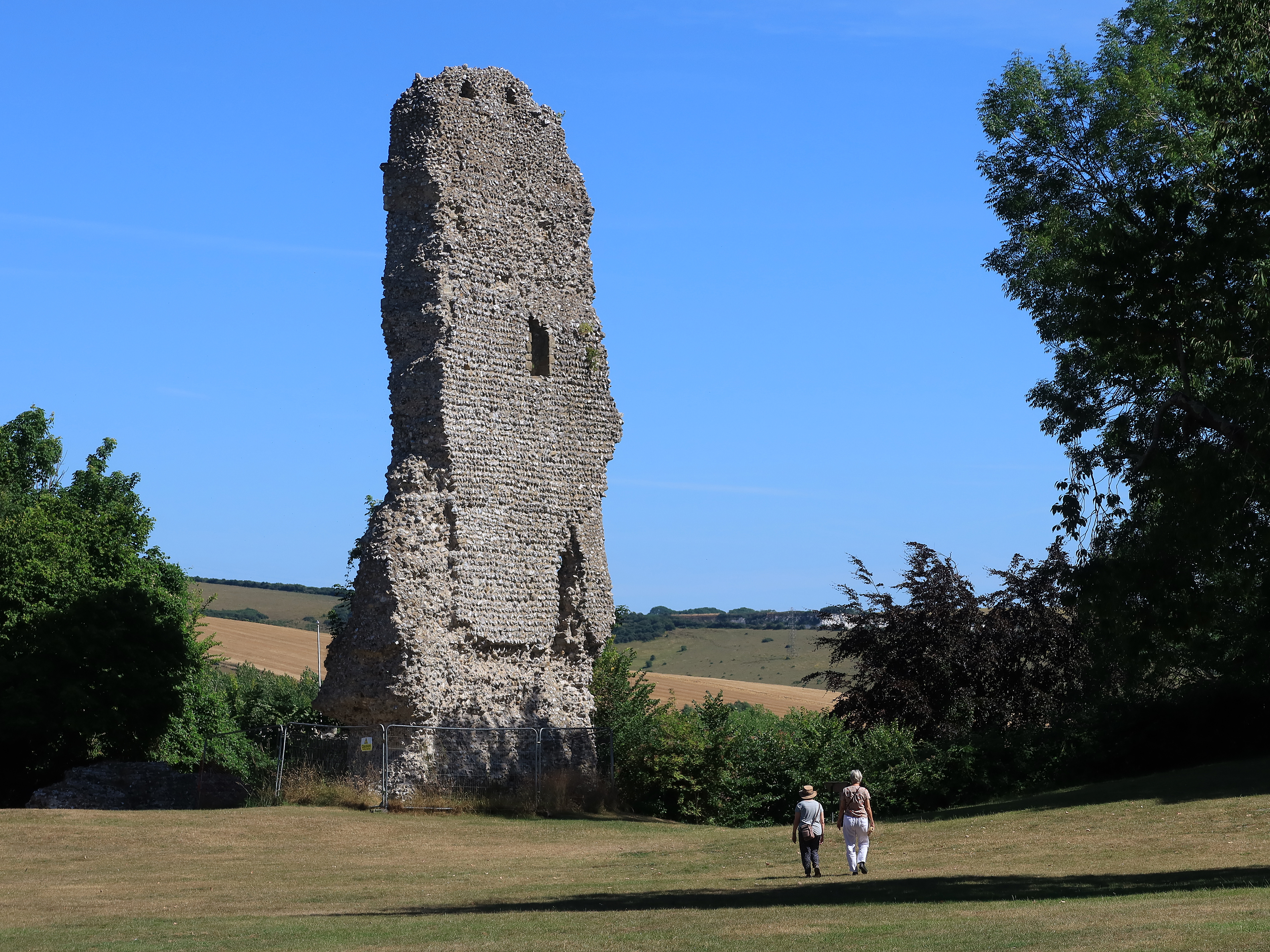
- The remains of the gatehouse

Site information
- Type: Motte-and-bailey
- Owner: English Heritage
- Open to the public: Yes
- Condition: Ruined

Location
- Shown within West Sussex
- Location within West Sussex
- Coordinates: 50°53′03″N 0°18′58″W
- Height: 17 metres

Site history
- Materials: Stone

Bramber Castle is the ruins of a Norman motte-and-bailey castle, formerly the caput of the large feudal barony of Bramber long held by the Braose family. It is situated in the village of Bramber, West Sussex, near the town of Steyning, overlooking the River Adur.

== History ==
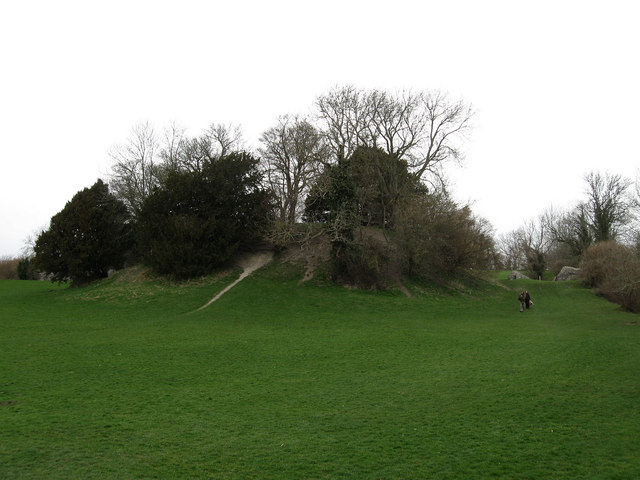
Motte of Bramber Castle, now overgrown and much reduced in height

Surveys indicate the Normans were the first to build a fortification in the area, around 1070. It served as the administrative hub of the newly created Rape of Bramber, and controlled the River Adur estuary. The castle was held by William de Braose, 1st Lord of Bramber, whose family originated from Falaise.

During the First Barons' War, King John (r. 1199–1216) gave instructions to demolished Knepp Castle in the same county and to use its resources to reinforce Bramber Castle.

Except for a short period when it was confiscated by King John, the castle remained in the de Braose family, until the male line died out in 1326, and it passed to the Mowbrays. Bramber was one of the poorest parts of Sussex, and while it remained a centre of administration, the Mowbrays did not live there; by the 1550s, it was recorded as 'the late castle', used for grazing.

During the First English Civil War, Bramber was held by a Parliamentary garrison, under James Temple and Simon Lentner. In December 1643, a skirmish took place nearby, when a Royalist force unsuccessfully tried to secure the bridge over the River Adur. However, it is unclear whether the castle itself was occupied, while there is no evidence to support a local myth that its associated church was used as a gun position.

The castle ruins and its 12 acres of land were acquired by the National Trust in 1945.

== Description ==
Little survives of the original structure, as much of the stone was later used to construct the bridge, and other buildings in the village. The castle was excavated in 1966–1967, with another minor survey in 1987; these indicate most of it was built between 1073 and 1130. The addition of an outer ditch around 1209 caused the collapse of much of the original curtain wall in the early 16th century.

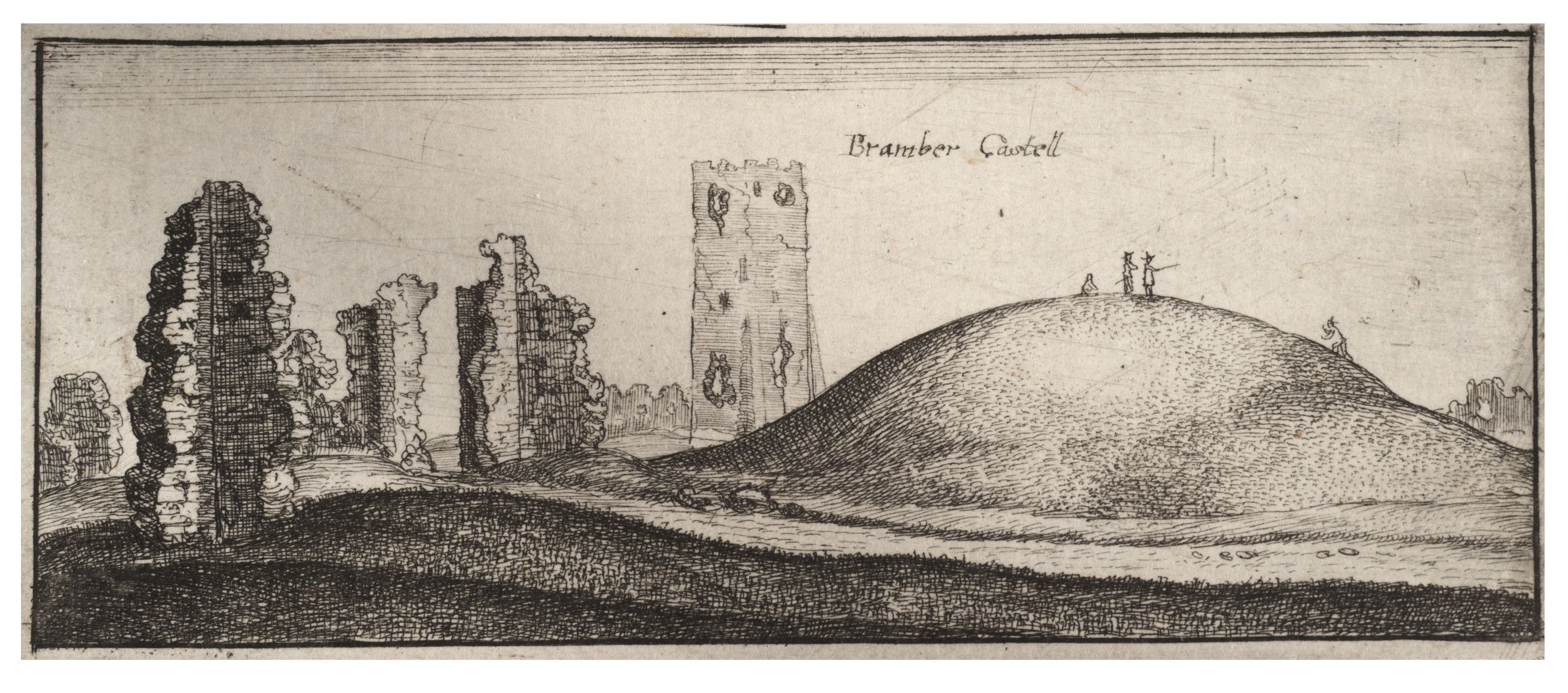
Sketch of the ruins of Bramber Castle by Wenceslas Hollar ca 1642

The most prominent remaining feature is the gatehouse tower, which still stands to almost its full height; a window, and floor joist holes are clearly visible. Beyond it are the foundations of what is believed to have been the living quarters and a guardhouse. The original gatehouse appears to have converted into a single tower at some point in the 12th century; another 3 metres were added to its height, while the entrances were blocked up. This coincides with an increased threat during the reign of John.

The dressed pillars of an entrance can be identified, but the bulk of the remaining walls now consist of only the basic rough stone infill. Situated to the north of the gatehouse is the original castle motte, its earthen mound rising to a height of some 30 ft (10 m). A short distance away is a section of the curtain wall which survives to a height up to 10 ft (3 m) in places.

St Nicholas's Church stands next to the entrance; originally constructed for the castle's inhabitants, it remains in use today.

== Later structures ==
During World War II, two pillboxes were constructed on the castle site, which have since been removed.

== Sources ==
- Baggs, AP; Currie, CRJ; Keeling, SM (1997) [1980]. "Bramber". In Hudson, TP (ed.). A History of the County of Sussex. Vol. 6, Part 1, Bramber, Southern Rape. Victoria County History. ISBN 978-0197227817.
- Bampfield, Joseph (1685). Colonel Joseph Bamfield's Apologie written by himself and printed at his desire.
- Barton, K. J.; Holden, E. W. (1977), "Five castle excavations: reports on the Institute's research project into the origins of the castle in England. Excavations at Bramber Castle, Sussex, 1966–67", The Archaeological Journal, 134: 11–79
- Butler, Chris (2008). West Sussex Under Attack Anti-Invasion sites 1500-1990. Tempus. ISBN 978-0-7524-4171-9.
- Fry, Plantagenet Somerset, The David & Charles Book of Castles, David & Charles, 1980. ISBN 0-7153-7976-3
- Harris, Roland (2004). Bramber Historic Character Assessment Report (PDF). West Sussex County Council.
- Hudson, T P (1986). "Shipley: Knepp Castle". In T P Hudson (ed.). A History of the County of Sussex: Volume 6 Part 2: Bramber Rape (North-Western Part) including Horsham. Institute of Historical Research. pp. 111–112.
