= Old Town Hall, Steyning =

Municipal building in Steyning, West Sussex, England

Old Town Hall
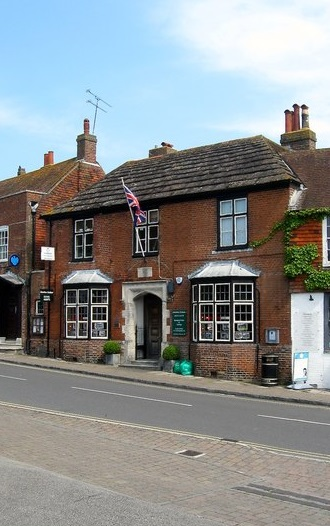
- Old Town Hall, Steyning

- Shown in West Sussex
- 50.8881°N 0.3285°W
- Location: High Street, Steyning

History
- Built: 1886

Site notes
- Architect: Charles Dalby
- Architectural style: Neo-Georgian style

Listed Building – Grade II
- Official name: 38, High Street
- Designated: 9 May 1980
- Reference no.: 1027267

The Old Town Hall is a municipal building in The High Street in Steyning, West Sussex, England. The building, which was used as a courthouse and a public events venue, is a Grade II listed building.

== History ==
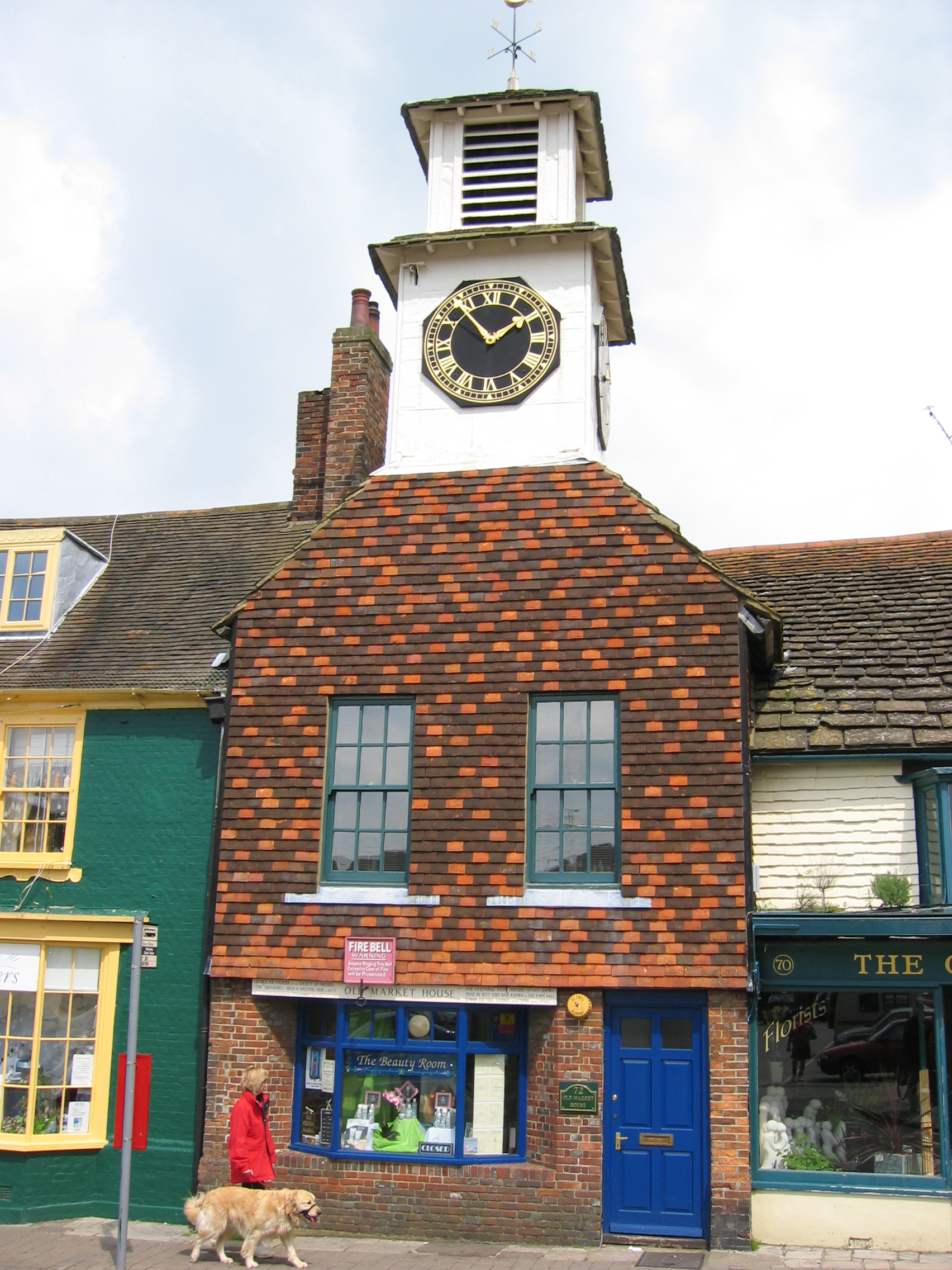
The second market house

The first municipal building in the town was a market house in the middle of the High Street: it was located just outside the current No. 44 High Street and dated back at least to the 15th century. It was arcaded on the ground floor, so that markets could be held, with an assembly room on the first floor. After it became very dilapidated and an obstruction to traffic, it was demolished in 1771.

A second market house was built on a site previously occupied by a house owned by Sir John Honywood, 3rd Baronet; it was a timber framed structure completed in 1771. Steyning had a very small electorate and two dominant patrons (Sir John Honywood and the Duke of Norfolk), which meant it was recognised by the UK Parliament as a rotten borough. Its borough council, which had met in the market hall, was abolished and its right to elect members of parliament was removed by the Reform Act 1832. A clock tower was added to the building in 1835.

In the 1870s, a group of local businessmen led by a local landowner, Colonel Robert Ingram, decided to form a company to finance and commission a new municipal building, which was initially designated the "Steyning Public Hall and Assembly Rooms". The new building was designed by a local architect, Charles Dalby, in the Neo-Georgian style, built by local builders, Messrs Chalcraft, in red brick at a cost of £791 and was completed in 1886.

The design involved a symmetrical main frontage with three bays facing onto the High Street; the central bay contained a doorway with a stone surround; the outer bays on the ground floor were fenestrated by canted bay windows, while the first floor was fenestrated by casement windows. A panel with the inscription "Town Hall 1886" was installed above the doorway and the building was given a hip roof. Internally, the principal room was the assembly hall, which was intended for use as a courtroom for petty session hearings and as a public events venue for up to 400 people.

West Sussex County Council acquired the town hall from the original development company in 1958 and erected modern courtrooms and prisoner cells to the rear of the town hall. The complex continued to act as a venue for magistrates' court hearings until the courts service relocated in 1994. The building was subsequently converted for commercial use and was subsequently occupied by a firm of estate agents.

The building is accessible by the Steyning Clock Tower bus stop, which is served by Brighton & Hove bus routes 2 and 60.
