= St Andrew and St Cuthman's Church, Steyning =

Anglican parish church in Steyning, West Sussex

Coordinates: 50°53′24″N 0°19′30″W

- Steyning Parish Church
- The church from the south
- St Andrew and St Cuthman's Church, Steyning
- OS grid reference: TQ 17906 11402
- Location: Steyning, West Sussex
- Address: Vicarage Lane, Steyning, Sussex, BN44 3YQ
- Country: England
- Denomination: Anglican
- Previous denomination: Roman Catholic
- Website: https://steyningparishchurch.org/

History
- Dedication: St Andrew and St Cuthman

Architecture
- Functional status: Active
- Heritage designation: Grade I listed
- Designated: 15 March 1955
- Style: Norman
- Years built: c.1100-c.1180

Administration
- Archdiocese: Canterbury
- Diocese: Chichester

St Andrew and St Cuthman's Church is an Anglican parish church in the town of Steyning, West Sussex. Although standing on the site of a Saxon minster, which played a role in the politics leading up to the Norman Conquest, the present building is an elaborate and impressive work of 12th century Norman architecture. The dedication was formerly solely to St Andrew, but was extended to include the local saint Cuthmann of Steyning in 2009.

== History ==
The church is traditionally held to have been founded as a religious community by Cuthmann in the eighth century; while this tradition relies on later medieval manuscripts, it is accepted by the Victoria County History. After his death, Cuthmann's burial in the church and veneration may have made Steyning a site of pilgrimage, bringing it wealth and patronage, with King Æthelwulf of Wessex (d.858) being buried there.

Steyning was granted to Fécamp Abbey in Normandy by Edward the Confessor in 1047 as thanksgiving for the abbey having sheltered him in his exile. The church was exempt from diocesan oversight, being answerable only to the Pope. This was one example of his patronage of Normans that caused tension with the powerful Godwin family, and Godwin expelled the Norman monks in 1052. Before he invaded England, William the Conqueror swore an oath to restore the church to Fécamp, which he did in 1086. Steyning thereafter became collegiate, and the monks of Fécamp set about expensively rebuilding the church, though they took the relics of St Cuthman to Normandy. The college was dissolved in c.1260, though the church retained its diocesan exemption.

The connection with Fécamp was severed in 1415 as part of the Dissolution of Alien Houses in the Hundred Years' War, when French monastic possessions were viewed with suspicion, and the church passed to Henry V's new abbey at Syon. Syon was itself dissolved in 1539, and the church at Steyning was neglected, with the east end being demolished some time after 1577, and the present squat west tower built on the site of the truncated west end of the nave. The church, and especially its east end, were restored several times in the 19th century.

== Architecture ==
The interior looking east

No traces of the Saxon church survive, though it is believed to have been made of timber. In the porch is a cross slab with two crosses. This is commonly asserted as that of King Æthelwulf, but it is more likely to be 11th century.

The Norman church was cruciform, with transepts and a central tower. It was probably begun in the late 11th century, after Fécamp's possession was confirmed. Of the first phase of works, only the tall western arch of the crossing (now the chancel arch) survives, dating from c.1100. Its responds have capitals with Celtic-inspired carving, similar to that of the Herefordshire School. The nave belongs to a later phase of construction, probably of the 1160s or '70s. It is now of four bays, though traces of further arches at the west end show that it was formerly longer. The nave elevation is of two storeys, similar to the contemporary St Davids Cathedral, and given verticality by recessed wall-shafts. The arches of the arcade are decorated with elaborate and varied chevron (zigzag) carving, producing a rich effect. Other less common mouldings are also used, while the capitals of the round columns are decorated with a variety of abstract and foliate ornaments. The clerestory has smaller round-arched openings which are extended downwards internally, while it has a corbel-table outside. The south door is also original, with a sanctuary ring.

The church shows evidence of extensive restoration both before and after the Reformation. The aisles were largely rebuilt in the later Middle Ages, while the west tower is a plain structure, probably late 16th century, though it bears a 1684 datestone. The chronology of the chancel is unclear, with proposed dates ranging from 1750 (Historic England) to 1863 (Ian Nairn). In the chancel is a carved timber reredos of 1522, brought from the old rectory.

== Gallery ==
The north arcade

Beakhead detail

Capital and arches

Foliate capital

Scalloped capital

Door and sanctuary ring

Norman font

Reredos panel
