= Bramber =

Village and parish in West Sussex, England

Coordinates: 50.8828°N 0.31414°W

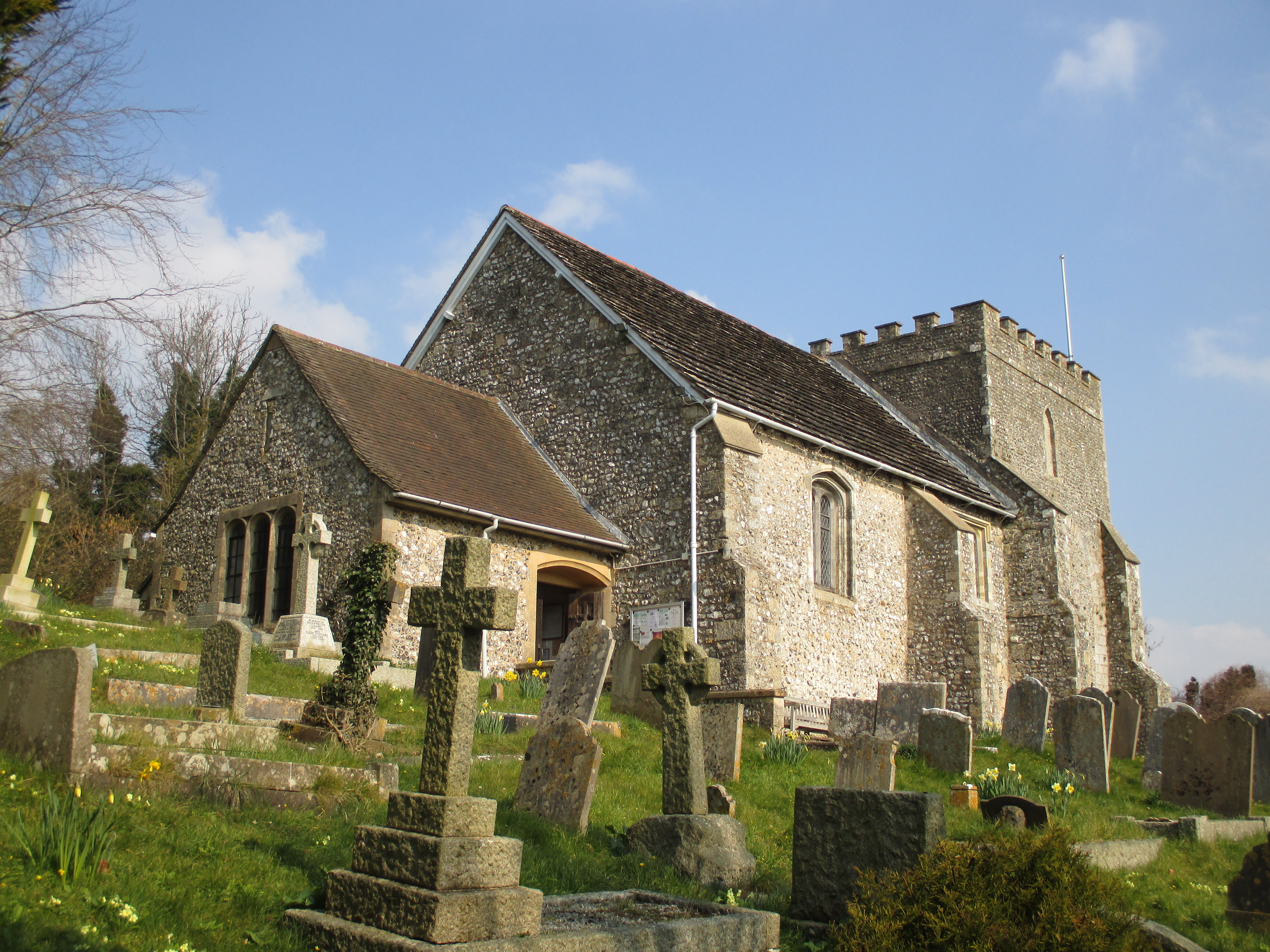
- Church of St. Nicholas

- Location within West Sussex
- Area: 7.19 km^{2} (2.78 sq mi)
- Population: 757 2001 Census; 785 (2011 Census including Botolphs)
  - Density: 105/km^{2} (270/sq mi)
- OS grid reference: TQ186106
  - London: 44 miles (71 km) NNE
- Civil parish: Bramber
- District: Horsham
- Shire county: West Sussex
- Region: South East
- Country: England
- Sovereign state: United Kingdom
- Post town: STEYNING
- Postcode district: BN44
- Dialling code: 01903
- Police: Sussex
- Fire: West Sussex
- Ambulance: South East Coast
- UK Parliament: Arundel and South Downs

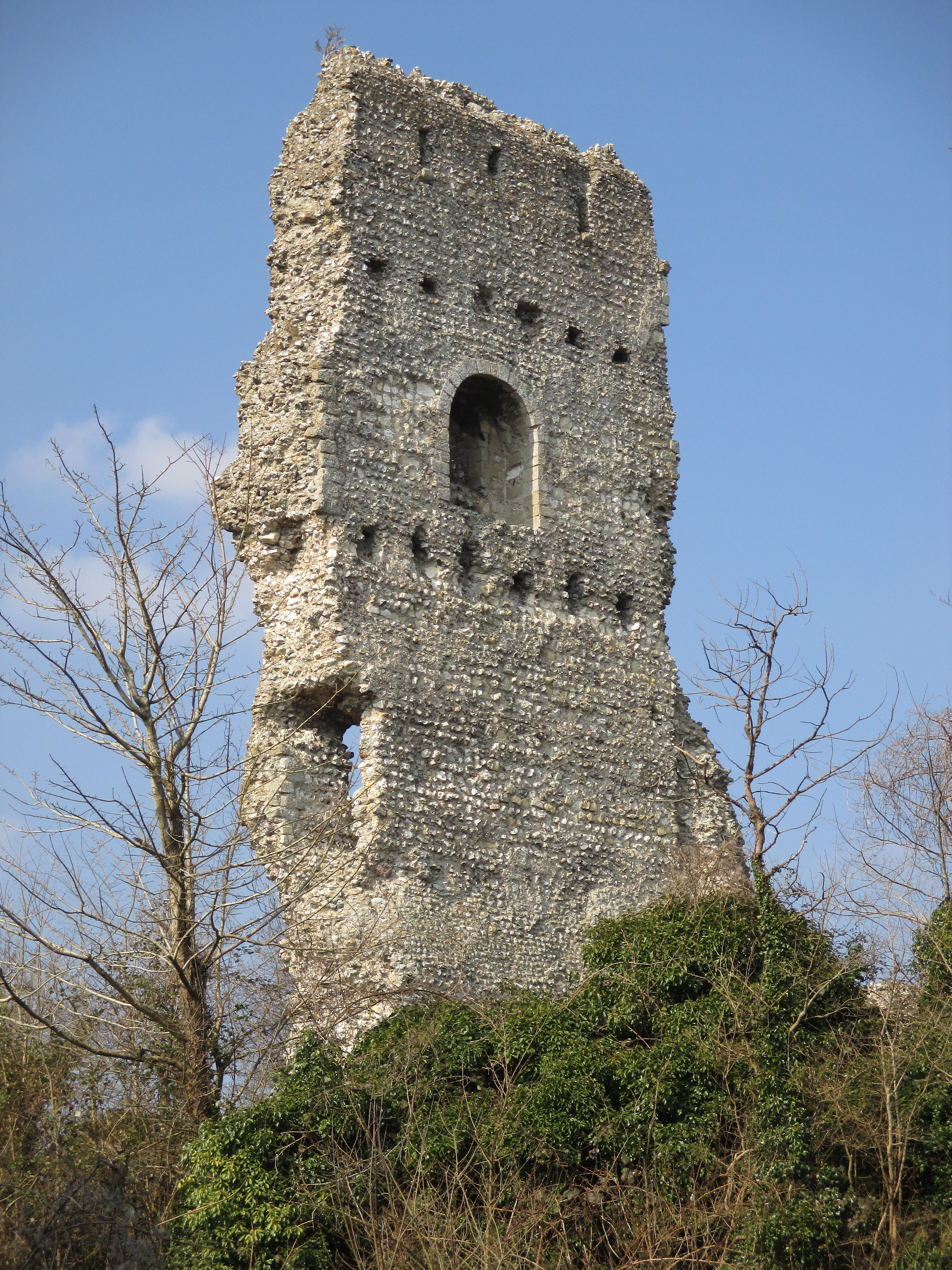
Remains of Bramber Castle

Bramber is a former manor, village and civil parish in the Horsham District of West Sussex, England. It has a ruined medieval castle which was the caput of a large feudal barony. Bramber is located on the northern edge of the South Downs and on the west side of the River Adur. Nearby are the communities of Steyning to the west and Upper Beeding to the east, and the other side of the river. The closest historical connection, however, is with the village of Botolphs to the south.

The ecclesiastical parishes of Bramber and Botolphs were united possibly as early as 1526, but certainly by 1534 with the priest living at Botolphs. Later the priest's official residence became the imposing Bramber mansion and landmark now called "Burletts" and located on Clays Hill. The union of the civil parish councils followed 400 years later in 1933.

== Castle ==
Bramber was the caput of a large feudal barony held from the 11th to 14th centuries by the Braose family which was noted for its impact on the medieval history of the southern Welsh Marches. On a small hill stand the remains of Bramber Castle, a Norman castle built by the family.

Bramber Parish Church of St Nicholas was originally built as the castle chapel and is the only part of the castle site not in ruins. The church attracts large numbers of tourists, and is the oldest post-Conquest Norman church in Sussex. Bramber Castle originally protected the Rape of Bramber, the historic sub-division of the county of Sussex.

== Feudal barons ==
Later arms of the Braose family: Azure semy of crosses-crosslet a lion double queued rampant or

The feudal barons of Bramber were as follows:

- William de Braose, 1st lord of Bramber (d. 1093/1096)
- Philip de Braose, 2nd lord of Bramber (d. ca 1135)
- William de Braose, 3rd lord of Bramber (d. aft. 1179)
- William de Braose, 4th lord of Bramber (1140/1150 – 1211) infamous for the Christmas Day Massacre of Welsh Princes at Abergavenny Castle in 1175
- Giles de Braose, bishop of Hereford, (d. 1215)
- Reginald de Braose (d. 1228)
- John de Braose (d. 1232)
- William de Braose, 1st Baron Braose (d. 1291)
- William de Braose, 2nd Baron Braose (d. 1326)
- John de Mowbray, 3rd Baron Mowbray (d. 1361)
- John de Mowbray, 4th Baron Mowbray (c. 1328–1368)
- Thomas de Mowbray who became 1st Duke of Norfolk

After this time the honour of Bramber was held by the Dukes of Norfolk.

== St Mary's House ==
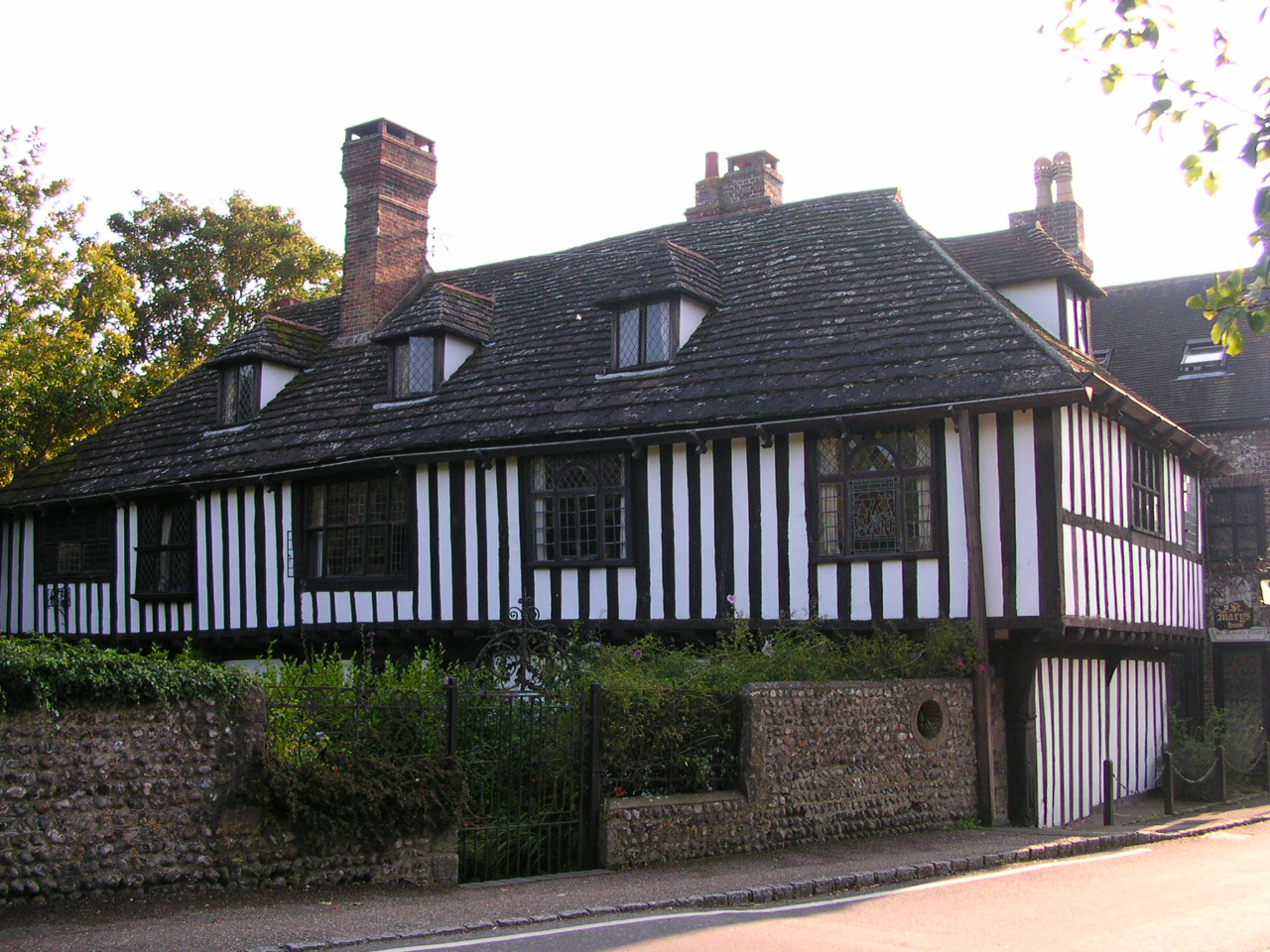
St Mary's House in The Street

Another historic building in Bramber is St Mary's House, a late 15th-century timber-framed house on a site associated with the Knights Templar. The present building was constructed in about 1470 by William of Waynflete, Bishop of Winchester and founder of Magdalen College, Oxford. The house has beautiful gardens with topiary figures, and a quite large secret garden at the back. The house is open to the public in season, and there is a tearoom in the grounds. The house has a music room which has two 14th-century ornately carved stone chantry tombs serving as fireplaces, and is regularly used for concerts and recitals.

Originally it was a monastic hostel for pilgrims and monks who collected the tolls at Bramber bridge, a 170-foot-long (52 m) bridge over the River Adur, incorporating a Chapel dedicated to St Mary the Virgin on its central span, though now reduced to a flat bridge of just a few feet over a tributary of the river, following silting, and a change of course. This should not be confused with the nearby Beeding Bridge, a hump-back bridge which now spans the main course of the river. King Charles II is claimed to have stayed at St Mary's House during his escape to France after defeat at the Battle of Worcester.

The Monarch's Way long-distance footpath, following Charles' supposed route to Shoreham-by-Sea, crosses the Adur at Bramber. The house has been used in a number of television productions including an episode of Doctor Who where the TARDIS landed inside. Its owners since 1984 are Peter Thorogood and Roger Linton.

== Maudlin District ==
Just outside Bramber, in the direction of Botolphs village, formerly stood a medieval hospital and nunnery, caring for sufferers of leprosy, and dedicated to St. Mary Magdalene. Although long since closed, this part of Bramber is still known as the "Maudlin District", spelt following a phonetic pronunciation of the saint's name. Maudlyn House stands on the site of the hospital, and nearby roads include Maudlin Lane, Maudlyn Park, Maudlyn Parkway, and Maudlyn Close.

== Political representation ==
Historically, Bramber returned two members (MPs) to the unreformed House of Commons. Amongst the most famous politicians to serve as Member for Bramber was William Wilberforce, the anti-slavery campaigner, and independent Tory politician.

== Former taxidermy museum ==
Taxidermist Walter Potter was a native of Bramber, and is buried in its churchyard. His museum of taxidermist's tableaux was once much visited. The museum building still stands, part having been incorporated into an Indian restaurant, and part having become garages for houses.

== See also ==
- Bramber (UK Parliament constituency)
- Bramber railway station
