= Steyning =

Town in West Sussex, England

Coordinates: 50°53′12″N 0°19′40″W

- Town and civil parish
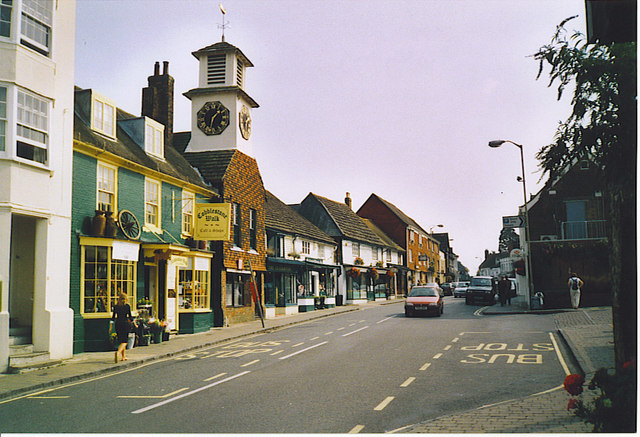
- High Street, Steyning town centre

- Location within West Sussex
- Area: 15.74 km^{2} (6.08 sq mi)
- Population: 5,832
  - Density: 369/km^{2} (960/sq mi)
- OS grid reference: TQ177110
  - London: 43 mi (69 km) NNE
- Civil parish: Steyning
- District: Horsham
- Shire county: West Sussex
- Region: South East
- Country: England
- Sovereign state: United Kingdom
- Post town: STEYNING
- Postcode district: BN44
- Dialling code: 01903
- Police: Sussex
- Fire: West Sussex
- Ambulance: South East Coast
- UK Parliament: Arundel and South Downs

Steyning (/ˈstɛnɪŋ/ STEN-ing) is a town and civil parish in the Horsham district of West Sussex, England. It is located at the north end of the River Adur gap in the South Downs, four miles (six kilometres) north of the coastal town of Shoreham-by-Sea.

The smaller villages of Bramber and Upper Beeding constitute, with Steyning, a built-up area at this crossing-point of the river.

== Demography ==
The parish has a land area of 1,574 hectares (3,890 acres). In the 2001 census 5,812 people lived in 2,530 households, of whom 2,747 were economically active.

== History ==
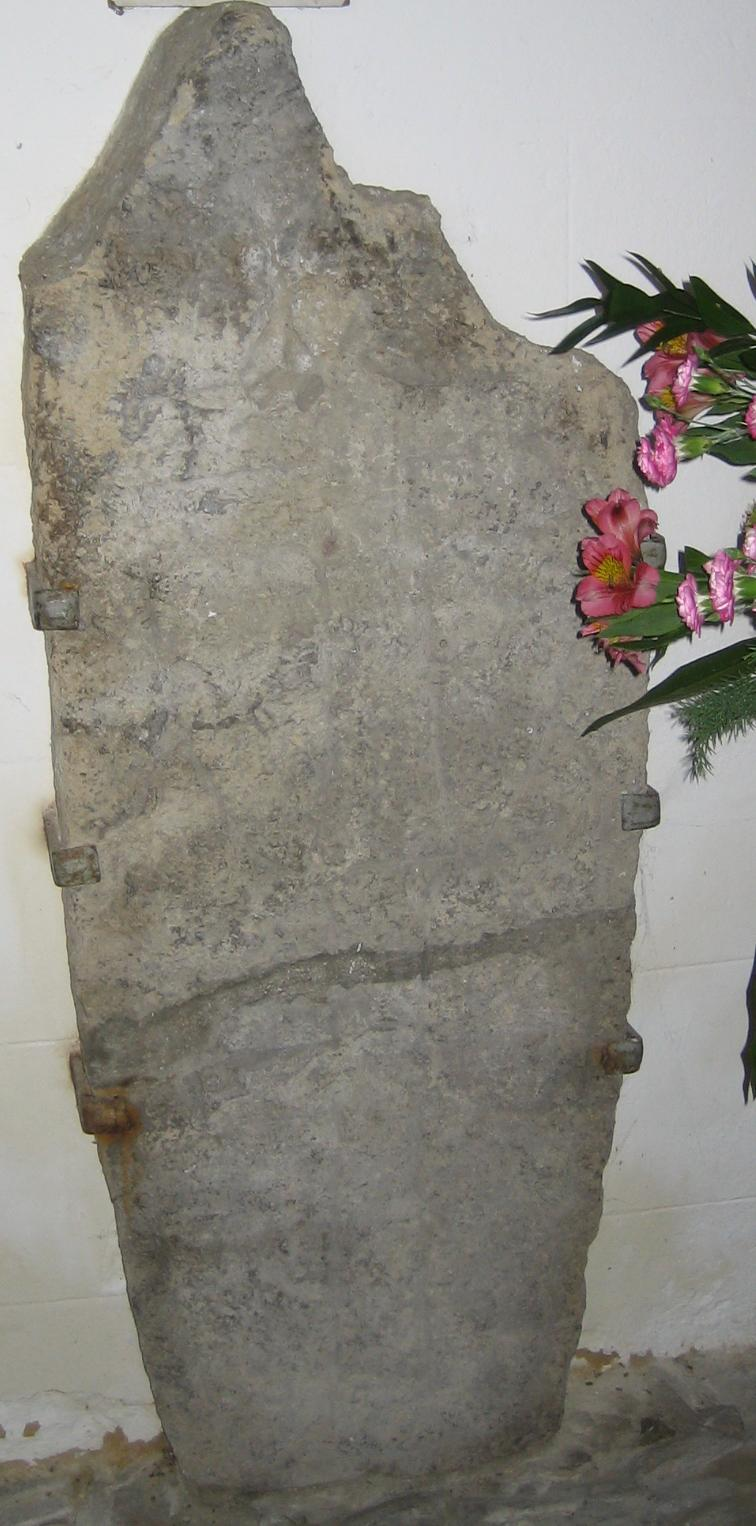
Possible tombstone of Æthelwulf, King of Wessex, in the church porch – the two incised crosses may indicate a royal burial

=== Saxon ===
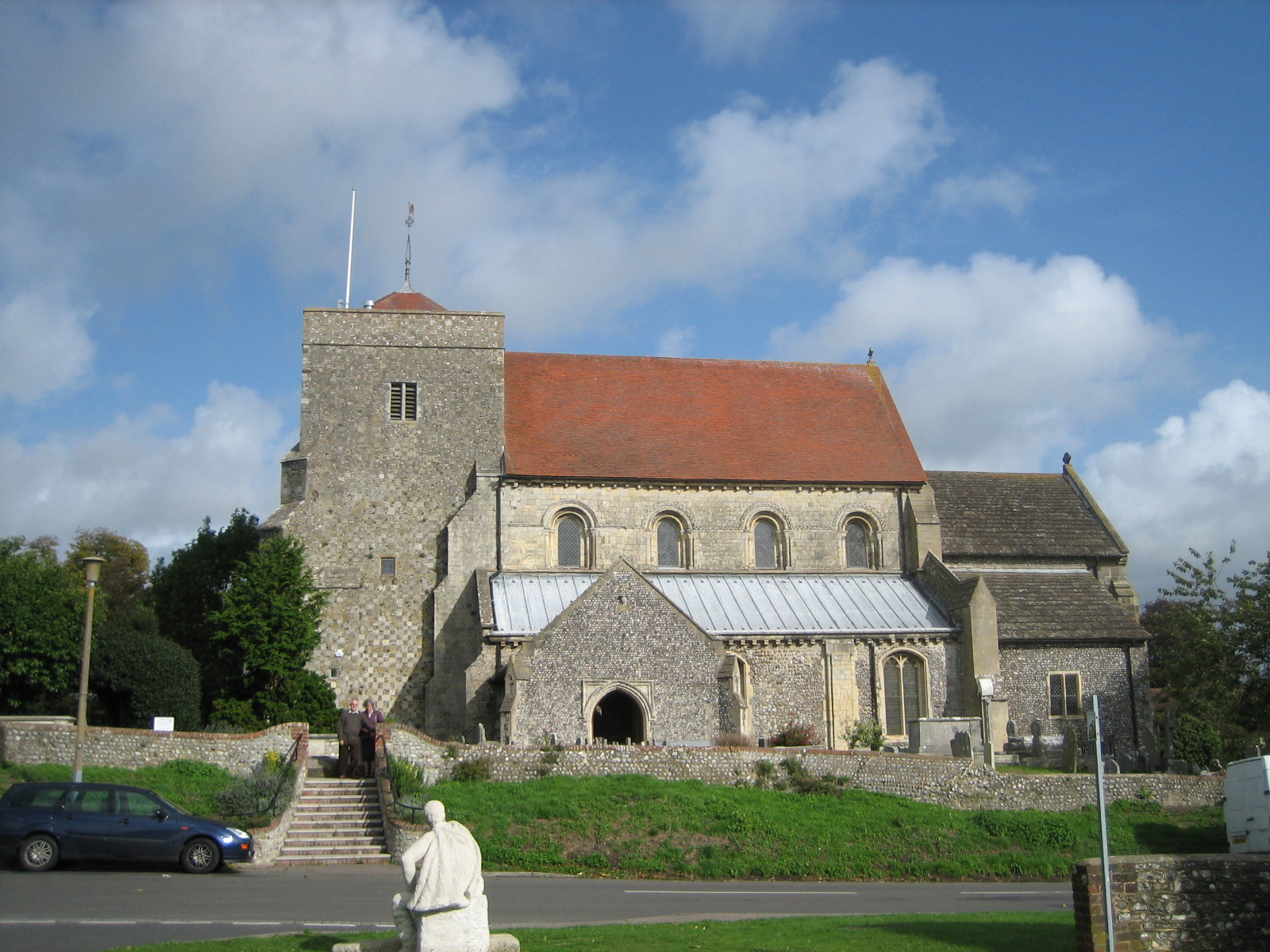
The church of St Andrew and St Cuthman, Steyning

The name Steyning possibly derives from the Old English stāning meaning 'the stone people' or the 'dwellers at the stony place'.

Steyning has existed since Anglo-Saxon times. Legend has it that St Cuthman built a church, at one time dedicated to him, later to St Andrew, and now jointly to St Andrew and St Cuthman, where he stopped after carrying his mother in a wheelbarrow. Several of the signs that can be seen on entering Steyning bear an image of his feat. In 858, according to the Annals of St Neots, Æthelwulf, King of Wessex, the father of Alfred the Great, was buried in the church. Æthelwulf's body was later transferred to Winchester, probably by Alfred. A carved Saxon grave slab (possibly Æthelwulf's) remains in the church porch.

=== Norman ===
To thank his Norman protectors for refuge during his exile, Edward the Confessor granted his royal minster church in Steyning, with its large and wealthy manor lands, to the Abbey Church of the Holy Trinity at Fécamp, to take effect after the death of Aelfwine, the Bishop of Winchester, who had charge of Steyning. The bishop died in 1047 and ecclesiastical jurisdiction then passed directly to the Pope. (In the same way, Fécamp Abbey itself answered to no Norman bishop, only to the Pope.) This was confirmed in a charter by William. Confirming the gift of Steyning, made by Edward the Confessor, this charter acquitted the grantees of all earthly service and subjection to barons, princes and others, and gave them all royal liberties, custom and justice over all matters arising in their land, and threatened any who should infringe these liberties with an amercement of £100 of gold. This was an addition to the nearby port with land around Rye, Winchelsea and Hastings, already given to the same Abbey by King Cnut, to honour a promise made by his wife Emma of Normandy's first husband King Aethelred. By then Steyning was already a thriving and important port with a market, a royal mint, the church founded by St Cuthman and one other church, as Domesday Book relates 60 years later. Godwin, Earl of Wessex expelled the Norman monks in 1052 and seized Steyning for himself, and his son Harold decided to keep it upon his accession. This made commercial and strategic sense as Harold did not want a Norman toehold in a potential invasion port, but William responded by swearing on a knife before setting out for England to recover it for the monks:

Of the land of Steyning [county of Sussex]; the Duke gave seisin to the Church by the token of a knife, before he went to England; the grant to take effect if God should give him victory in England.

Witnesses: Aymeri the vicomte; Richard fitzGilbert; Pons.

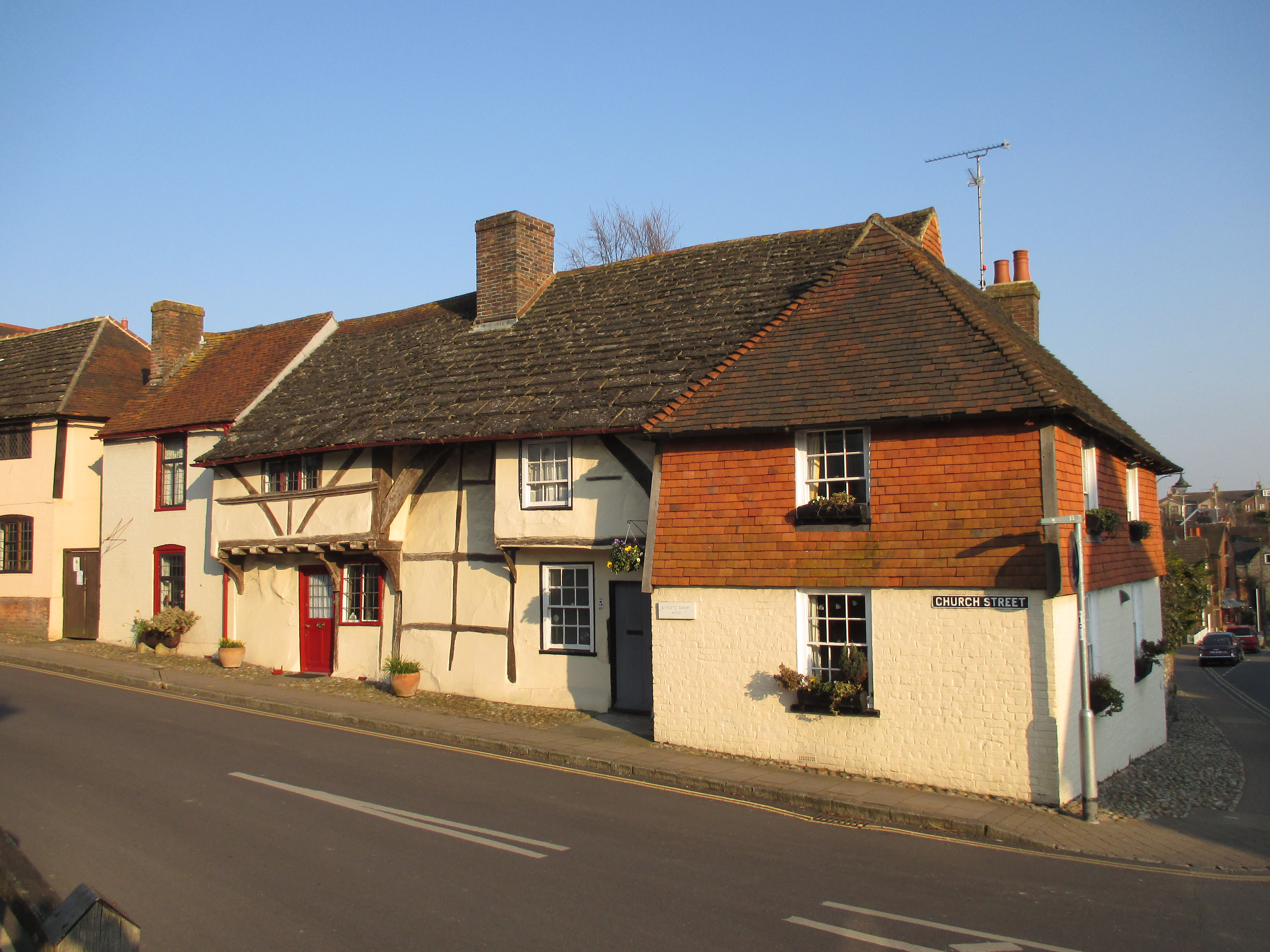
Medieval cottages on the corner of Church Street and High Street

This gained him a ship from Fécamp and, upon his victory at Hastings, he honoured his promise and returned it to the monks. However, its strategic importance made William place William de Braose in a new castle at nearby Bramber, who began a vigorous boundary dispute and power tussle with the monks, William's settlement having lacked definite terms in the first place. Domesday Book, completed in 1086, brought this to a head. It found that de Braose had built a bridge at Bramber and demanded tolls from ships travelling further along the river to the port at Steyning. The monks challenged Bramber's right to bury its parishioners in the churchyard at William de Braose's new church of St Nicholas, and demanded its burial fees, despite it being built to serve the castle not the town. The monks produced forged documents to defend their position and were unhappy with the failure of their claim on Hastings. In 1086 the king called his sons, barons and bishops to court (the last time an English king presided personally, with his full court, to decide a matter of law) to settle this. It took a full day, and the Abbey won over the court, forcing de Braose to curtail his bridge tolls, give up various encroachments onto the abbey's lands and organise a mass exhumation and transfer of all Bramber's dead to the churchyard of Saint Cuthman's Church in Steyning.

=== Mid to Late Medieval ===
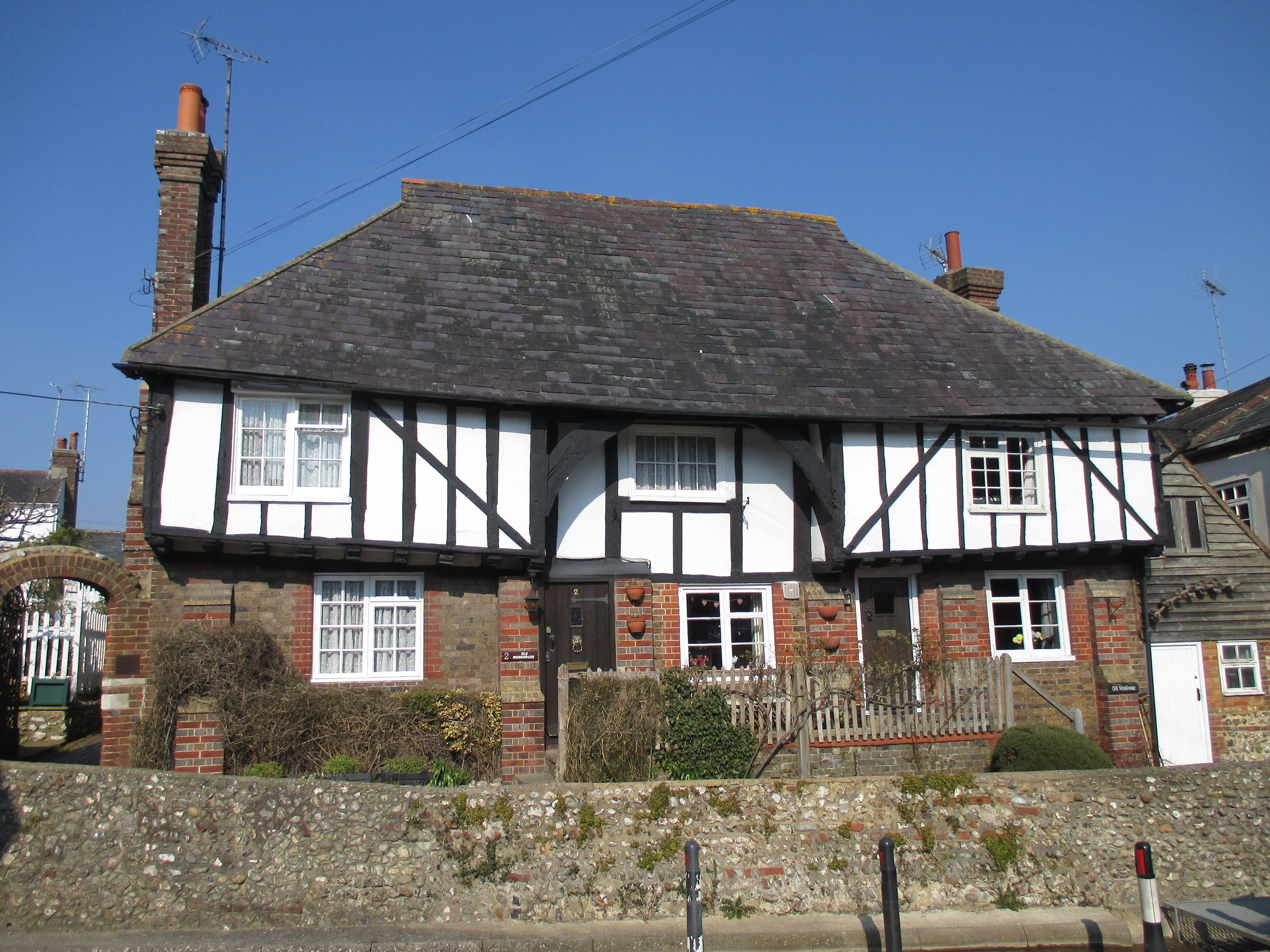
The Old Workhouse, Mouse Lane

Even the 1086 judgment did not settle the Steyning versus Bramber dispute once and for all; it continued for centuries afterwards, exacerbated by the Lord of Bramber founding his own religious establishments in his neighbouring parish. Meanwhile, in the 14th century, the River Adur began to silt up and the town's use as a port became difficult leading to a loss of trade and population. The monks of Fécamp Abbey retained control of Steyning until the 15th century, and re-dedicated the church of St Cuthman to St Andrew in the 13th century.

Steyning began returning two members of parliament from 1278 and as a rotten borough made up of a depopulated port became similar to Dunwich until the Reform Act 1832.

=== 17th century ===
In 1614, William Holland, Alderman of Chichester founded and endowed Steyning Grammar School.

=== 19th century ===
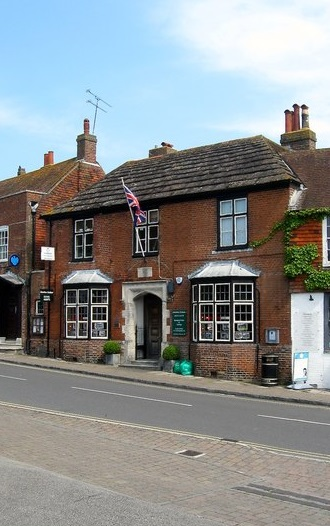
The Old Town Hall

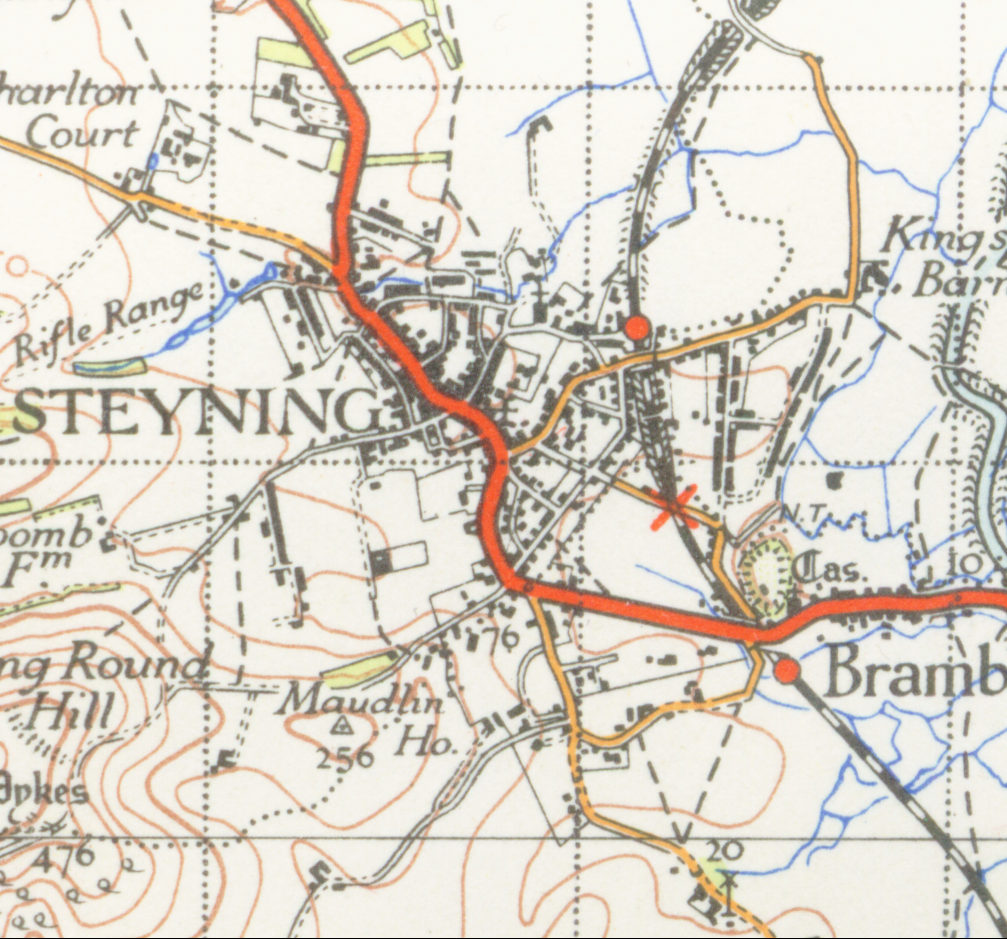
Map of Steyning from 1946

The Steyning Line railway from London to Shoreham arrived in Steyning in 1861 and a station was opened to serve the town. The railway remained in service for over a century, closing in 1966 as result of the Beeching Axe. The route of the railway line has since been converted into a footpath and cycleway known as the Downs Link. The nearest railway station to the town today is Shoreham-by-Sea, some 5–6 miles away by road.

The Old Town Hall, currently used as an estate agents, at 38 High Street, was built in 1886.

The legendary Irish politician Charles Stewart Parnell married 'Kitty' O'Shea (niece of Lord Hatherley) here in 1891, the culmination of an adulterous affair that saw his fall from power, catastrophically dividing Irish politics.

Besides much agriculture, brewing, a tannery (Tanyard Lane) and, to a small extent, brickmaking, more than 25 men were employed in sheep related trades as fellmongers, four or more were parchment makers, five were millers and there was a surgeon, James M. Burfield an oil painter, and a watch maker in the town during the 1881 census.

== Modern town ==
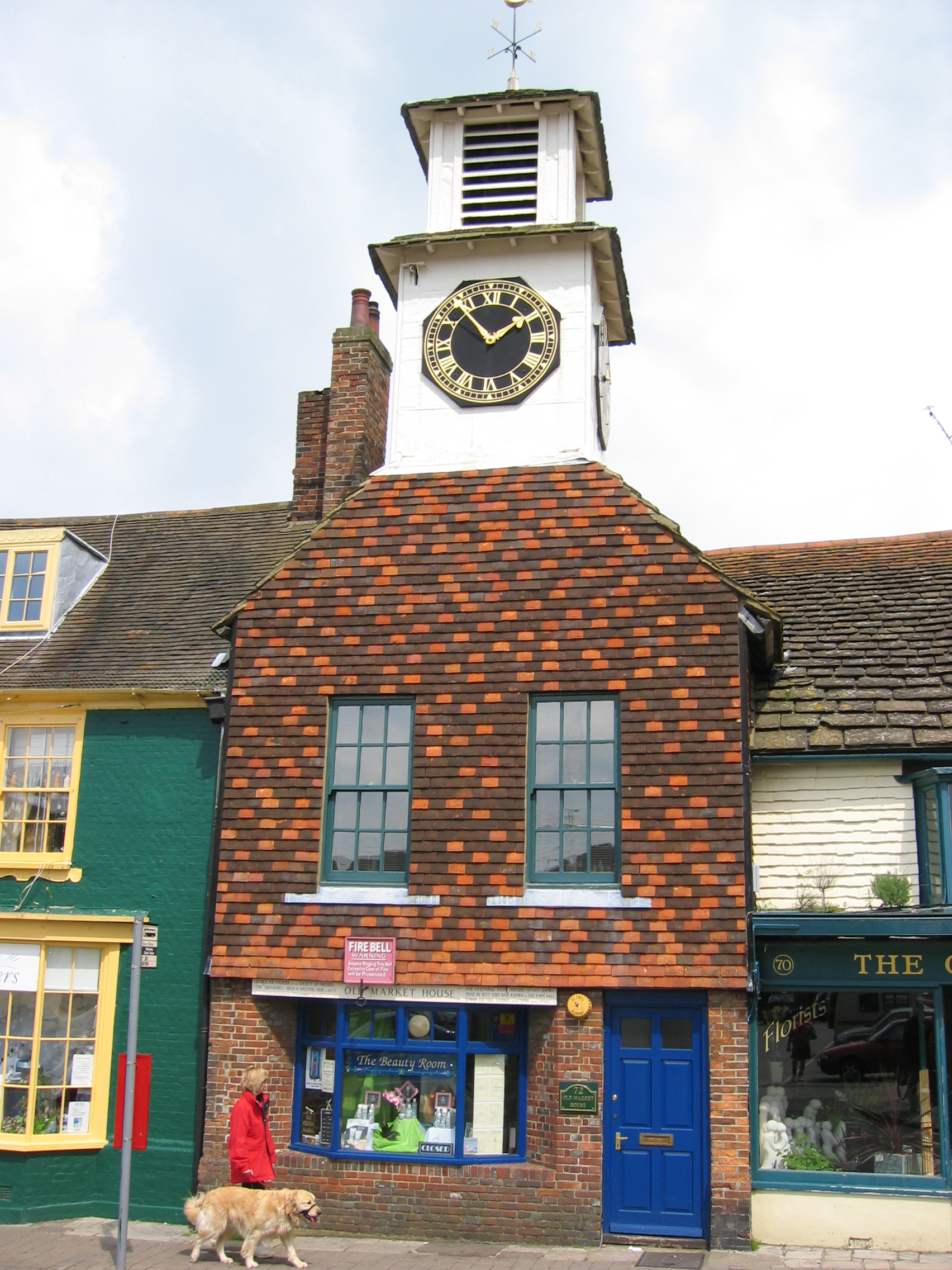
The Clock Tower in Steyning High Street

Steyning has three pubs: the Star Inn, the Chequer Inn and the White Horse, as well as a number of restaurants and cafes. A fourth pub, the Grade II listed Norfolk Arms, closed in 2021., In addition there are a number of shops, a health centre, a public library and the Steyning Museum. The leisure centre was built with National Lottery funding.

A spring fair is held on the Spring bank holiday (the last Monday in May).

The Monarch's Way long-distance footpath skirts the southern end of the town.

Steyning continues to be served by regular public transport. Bus operator Brighton & Hove operates route 2 hourly to Steyning from Rottingdean via Brighton, Hove and Shoreham-by-Sea.

== Schools ==
The town is home to Steyning Grammar School, of around 1,950 pupils and with a Sixth Form College comprising over 200 students. The school has been part of the Bohunt Education Trust (BET) since 2021. The school has a catchment area that extends as far as Dial Post and sometimes Worthing. Steyning is also home to a primary school (~400 pupils) and a pre-school.

== Steyning Festival ==
The Steyning Festival was founded in 2006. The event is biennial and runs for two weeks at the end of May/start of June. It includes theatre, music, literature, talks, walks and community events.

In 2009, the Steyning Festival was awarded a lottery grant to bring international artist and psychogeographer Chris Dooks to Steyning for a month-long residency, resulting in a free MP3 tour.

== Sport and leisure ==
There is a long established cricket club near the police station. Steyning has a non-league football club called Steyning Town Community Football Club, who play at the Shooting Field. The town also has its own leisure centre.

Steyning Athletic Club, established in 1951, offers a variety of sports to members - including Running, Swimming, Cycling, Race walking, Circuits/Fitness and Triathlon. Annual Club events include the Roundhill Romp (10k running race that is part of the Sussex Fun Run League) and the Steyning Stinger (Full Marathon and Half Marathon on the South Downs).

Steyning is also host to a detachment of the Army Cadet Force, and an Air Training Corps squadron, both national voluntary youth organisations sponsored by the MoD.

== Notable residents ==
- Peter Carter-Ruck, founder of Carter-Ruck Solicitors, was born in the town in 1914
- Major-General Sir Ernest Marshall Cowell, military officer and surgeon, born and grew up in Steyning
- E. M. Delafield, author, was born and grew up in Steyning
- Sally Gunnell, former British athlete and gold-medal winner in the 1992 Summer Olympic Games
- Charles Handley-Read, architectural writer and collector, was born in the town in 1916
- Bernard Holden, railway engineer and president of the Bluebell Railway lived in the Station Master's House from 1912 and attended Steyning Grammar School in the 1920s
- Ray Jones, priest, retired to Steyning in 2009
- Victor Benjamin Neuburg occultist and poet, proprietor of the Vine Press
- Elizabeth Norton, historian and author, grew up in Steyning and was educated at Steyning Grammar School
- Richard Raphael, cricketer
- W. B. Yeats, the Irish poet, stayed at the Chantry House in his later years with his mistress Edith Shackleton Heald; she spent her last years there with the artist Gluck.
- Maisie Peters singer-songwriter, was born in Steyning
- Julia Donaldson, author of The Gruffalo and other successful children's story books.
