= Cuthmann of Steyning =

Anglo-Saxon hermit and church-builder

Saint Cuthmann of Steyning
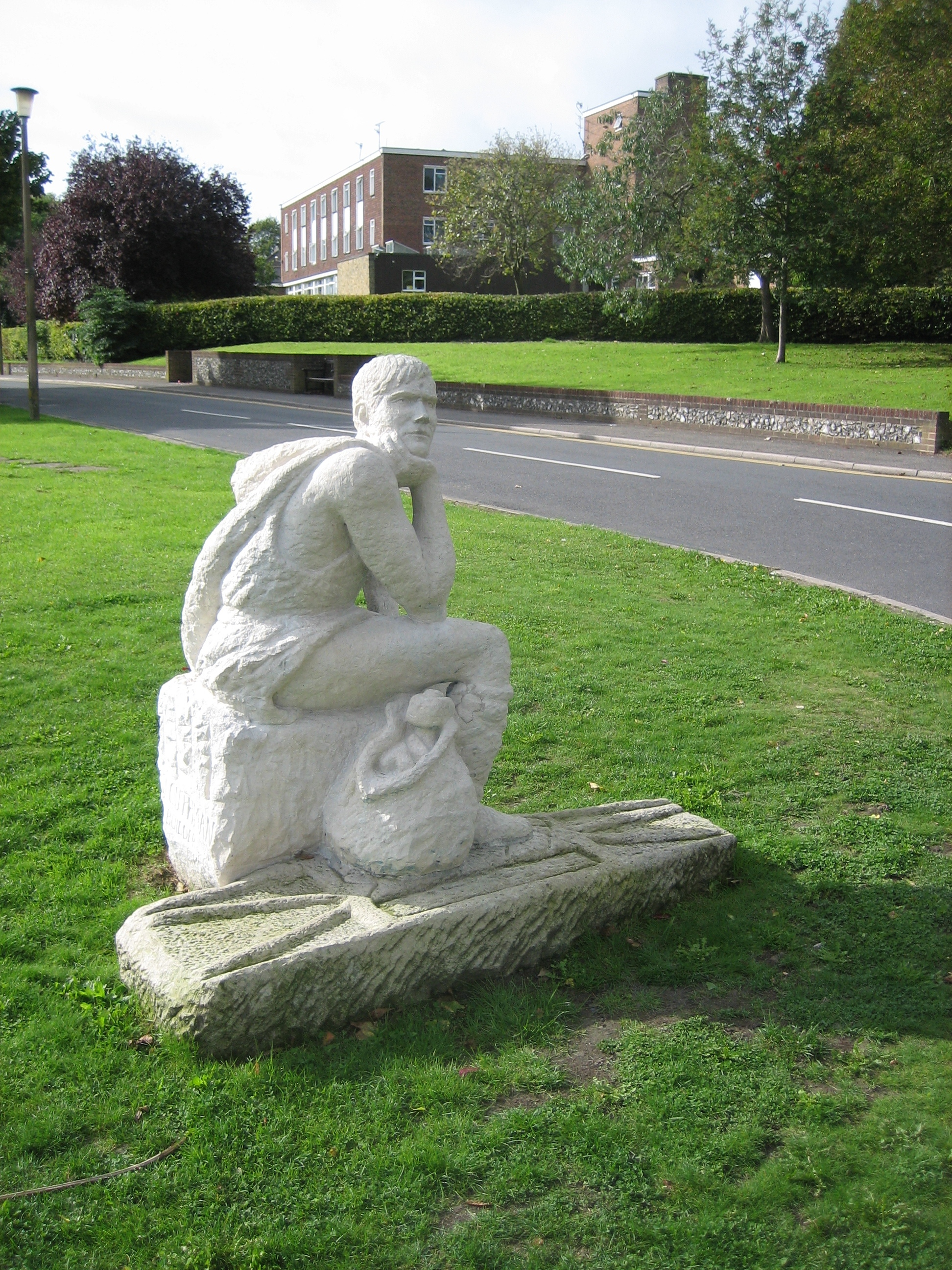
- Modern statue of Cuthmann by Penny Reeve, looking over the road to the church he founded at Steyning.

Hermit
- Born: c. 681; Chidham, near Bosham, Kingdom of Sussex (some legends say Devon or Cornwall)
- Died: 8th century Steyning, Sussex
- Venerated in: Roman Catholic Church; Anglican Communion; Eastern Orthodox Church
- Major shrine: St Andrew and St Cuthman's Church, Steyning – relics translated to Fécamp Abbey in the 11th century
- Feast: 8 February
- Attributes: wheelbarrow
- Patronage: Shepherd; Steyning, West Sussex

Saint Cuthmann of Steyning (c. 681 – 8th century), also spelt Cuthman, was an Anglo-Saxon hermit and church-builder in Sussex.

== Life ==
=== Birth ===
In the biography of the saint in the Acta Sanctorum which was preserved at the Abbey of Fécamp in Normandy (Note: After the Norman Conquest this abbey had acquired Cuthmann's church at Steyning – by then dedicated to him – turning it into a minster church, administered by a college of secular canons, and taking his relics to Fécamp. This college was dissolved in 1260 and the church was rebuilt, rededicated to St Andrew and became a standard parish church, with vicars appointed by the Abbey.) it is said that he was born about 681, either in Devon or Cornwall, or more probably at Chidham, near Bosham, about 25 miles from Steyning. (Note: This would make his journey from his birthplace to Steyning of a more rational length.) It is speculated that his birth in Chidham at that date would place him in the right time and area to be preached to by Saint Wilfrid, the Apostle of Sussex (680–685), and would probably make Wilfrid the man who converted and baptised Cuthmann and his parents. (Note: Some authorities give him a date later than this.)

=== Travels to Steyning ===
His legend states he was a shepherd who had to care for his paralysed mother after his father's death. When they fell on hard times and were forced to beg from door to door, he built a one-wheeled cart or wheelbarrow (with a rope from the handles over his shoulders taking part of the weight) in which he moved her around with him. They set out east, towards the rising sun, from his home and, even though the rope broke, he improvised a new one from withies, deciding that when that rope broke he would accept it as a sign from God to stop at that place and build a church. (Note: Some haymakers who were watching laughed at him, but a heavy rainstorm ruined their hay and taught them a lesson. Later versions of the story say that, from that moment onwards, it always rained in that particular field during the haymaking season.) The withy rope broke at the place now called Steyning, upon which (according to his biography) he prayed:

"Father Almighty, you have brought my wanderings to an end; now enable me to begin this work. For who am I, Lord, that I should build a house to name? If I rely on myself, it will be of no avail, but it is you who will assist me. You have given me the desire to be a builder; make up for my lack of skill, and bring the work of building this holy house to its completion."

After building a hut to accommodate his mother and himself, he began work on the church (now St Andrew's, Steyning, which in the 20th century instituted a Cuthmann chapel in his honour), with help from the locals. As the church was nearing completion and Cuthmann was having difficulty with a roof-beam, a stranger showed him how to fix it. When Cuthmann asked his name, he replied: "I am he in whose name you are building this church." (Note: i.e. St Andrew)

Whatever date is ascribed to Cuthmann, this church was in existence by 858, when, according to the Annals of St Neots, Æthelwulf, King of Wessex, the father of Alfred the Great, was buried there.

=== Other legends ===
According to one legend, Chanctonbury Ring near Steyning was created by the Devil who became so angry at the conversion of England thanks to 'apostles' like Cuthmann that he decided to dig a channel by night to let in the sea and drown the Christians of Sussex. Fortunately, Cuthmann found out the Devil's plan and tricked him by holding a candle behind a sieve and knocking the local cock off its perch. When the Devil saw the light and heard the cock crow, he fled the scene, leaving his great plan unfinished and giving us a complex of hills (the mounds of earth from his digging), including Chanctonbury Ring and the nearby ‘Devil's Dyke’.

According to another, whilst he was a shepherd, one day he drew a line around his sheep with his staff so that he could get away to collect food. On his return, he found that the flock had not left the invisible boundary. This miracle may have taken place in a field near Chidham, which for centuries was known as ‘St Cuthman’s Field’ or ‘St Cuthman’s Dell’. It was said that a large stone in the field, "on which the holy shepherd was in the habit of sitting", held miraculous properties.

== Veneration ==
Cuthmann was venerated as a saint in the Steyning area before the Norman Conquest. In charters of William the Conqueror, Steyning is sometimes called "St Cuthman's Port" or "St Cuthman's Parish".

The translation of his relics to Fécamp led to his becoming well known on the continent and even to his feast being celebrated at many of the religious houses of Normandy. This can be seen most clearly in a c. 1450 German engraving of him with his "cart" by Martin Schongauer, and the inclusion, transcription (from an anonymous source) and printing of his Life in the saints' lives collected in 1658 in the Bollandist Acta Sanctorum, giving his feast day as 8 February.

There is also a choir seat carving at Ripon Cathedral dating from a few decades after 1450 (with him and a three-wheeled wheelbarrow) and at his birthplace of Chidham there was a Guild of St Cuthman, subject to a tax in 1522 under Henry VIII.

Though the church he founded at Steyning was later re-dedicated to Andrew not Cuthmann, moves began in January 2007 within the parish to have it rededicated to "St Andrew and St Cuthman", giving the apostle Andrew precedence but reincluding Cuthmann – these moves succeeded and the church is now dedicated to "St Andrew and St Cuthman". The church also has a Cuthmann chapel and a statue of him outside by artist Penny Reeve, while a picture of him with his wheelbarrow also continues to be Steyning's logo on its town sign.

Christopher Fry wrote a play on him in 1938 called The Boy with a Cart. In 1950, it was performed at the Lyric Theatre, Hammersmith, directed by John Gielgud and with Richard Burton as Cuthman. The following is a quotation:

It is there in the story of Cuthman, the working together
Of man and God like root and sky; the son
Of a Cornish (Note: Fry used the Cornish birthplace in his plot, rather than the Sussex one.) shepherd, Cuthman, the boy with a cart,
The boy we saw trudging the sheep-tracks with his mother
Mile upon mile over five counties; one
Fixed purpose biting his heels and lifting his heart.
We saw him; we saw him with a grass in his mouth, chewing
And travelling. We saw him building at last
A church among whortleberries…

== Gallery ==
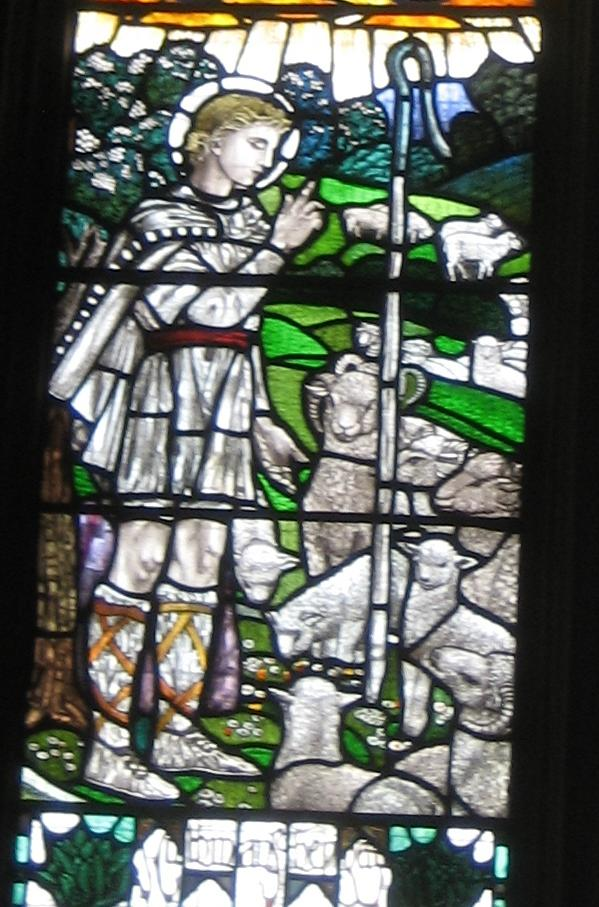
Cuthmann the shepherd from a window in the south aisle of St Andrew's, Steyning

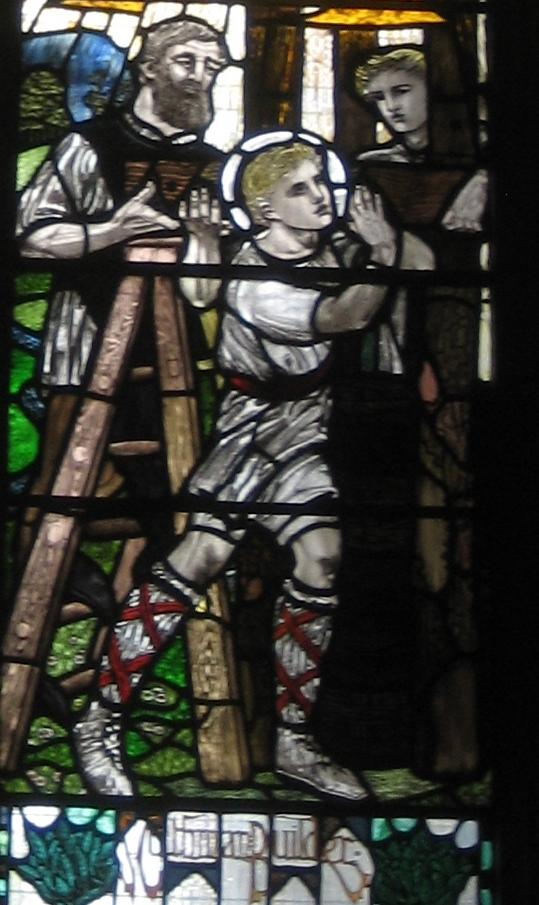
Cuthmann the Builder, in the same window

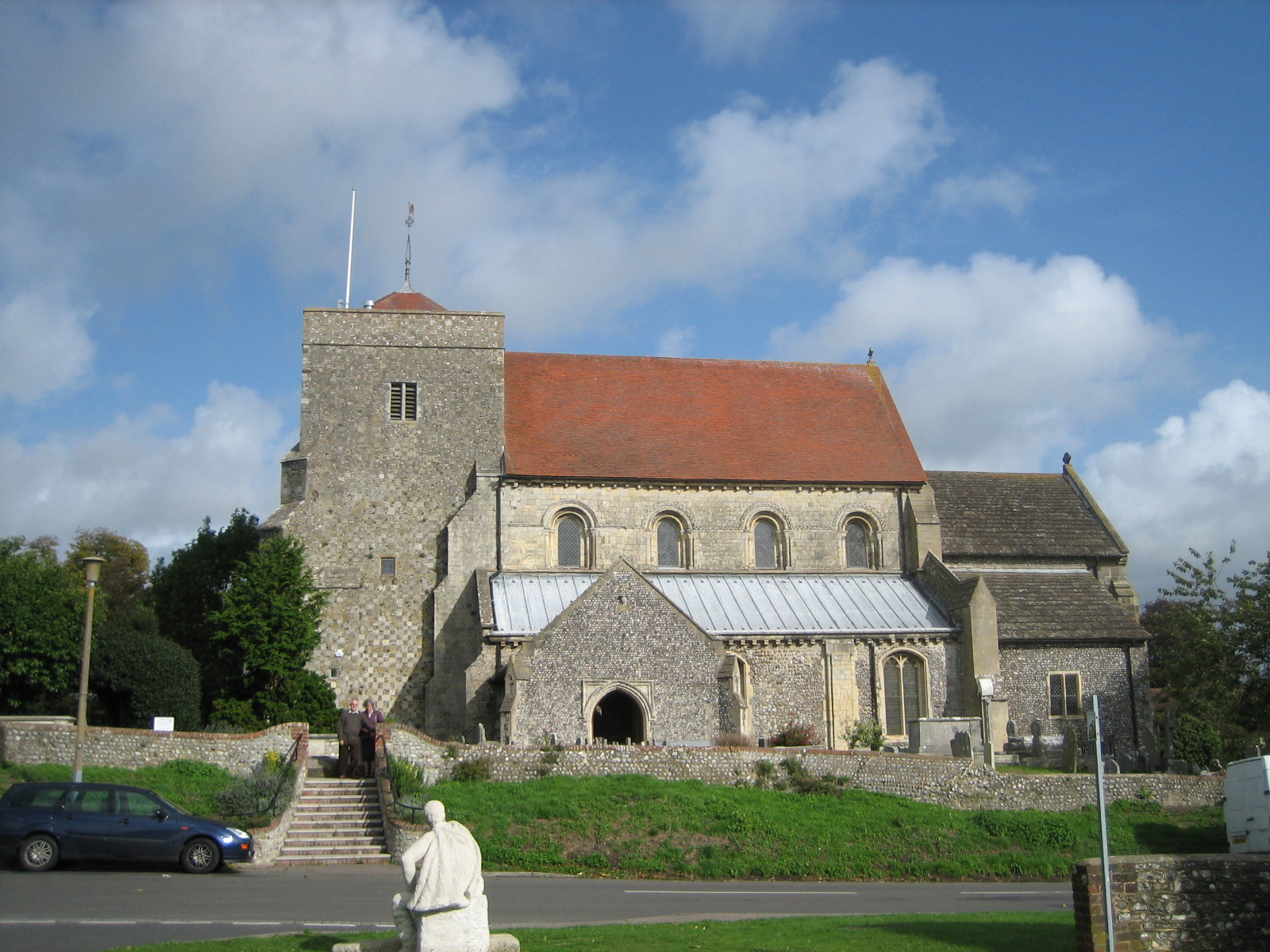
St Andrew's, Steyning

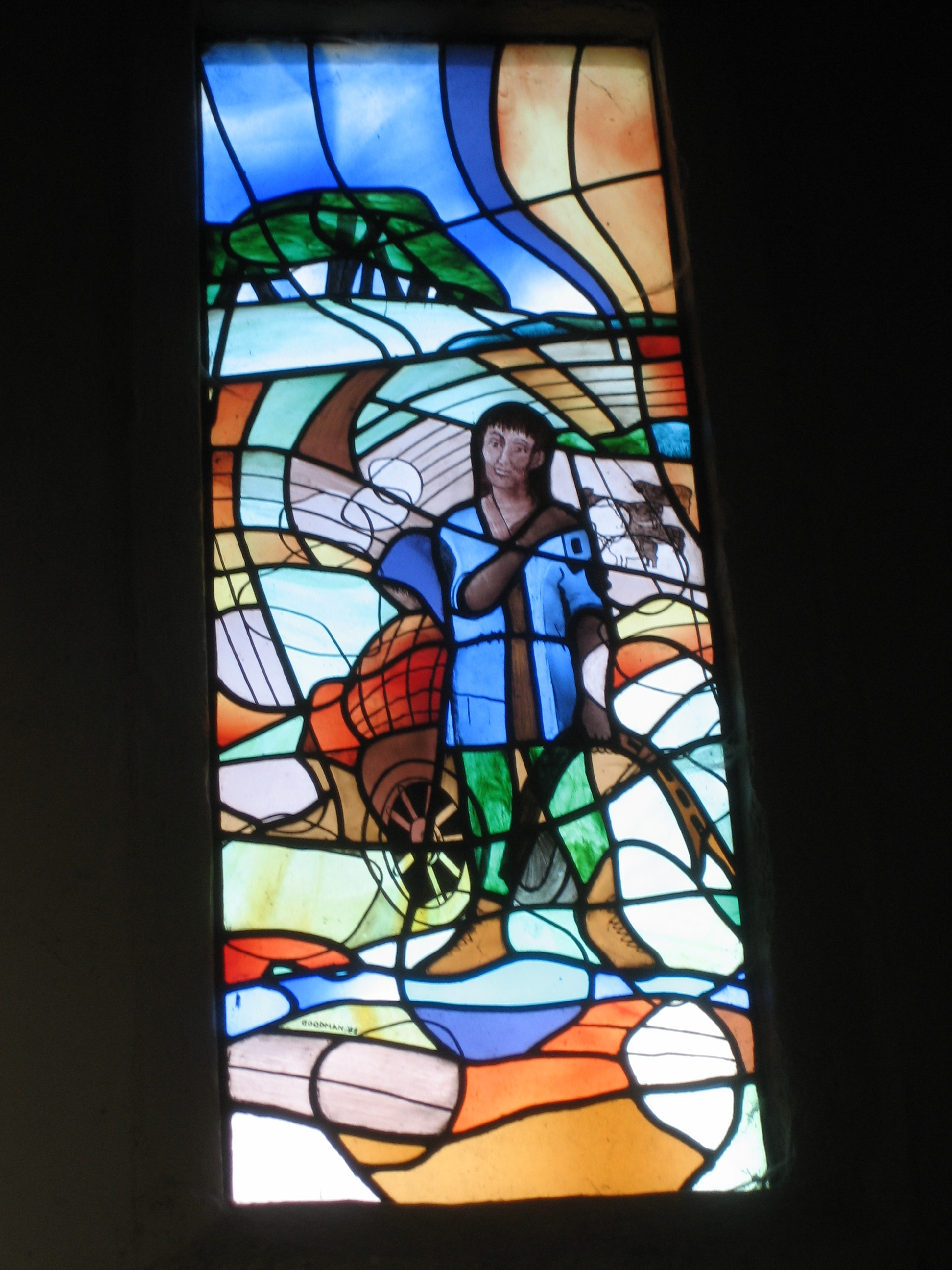
Window in the Cuthmann Chapel

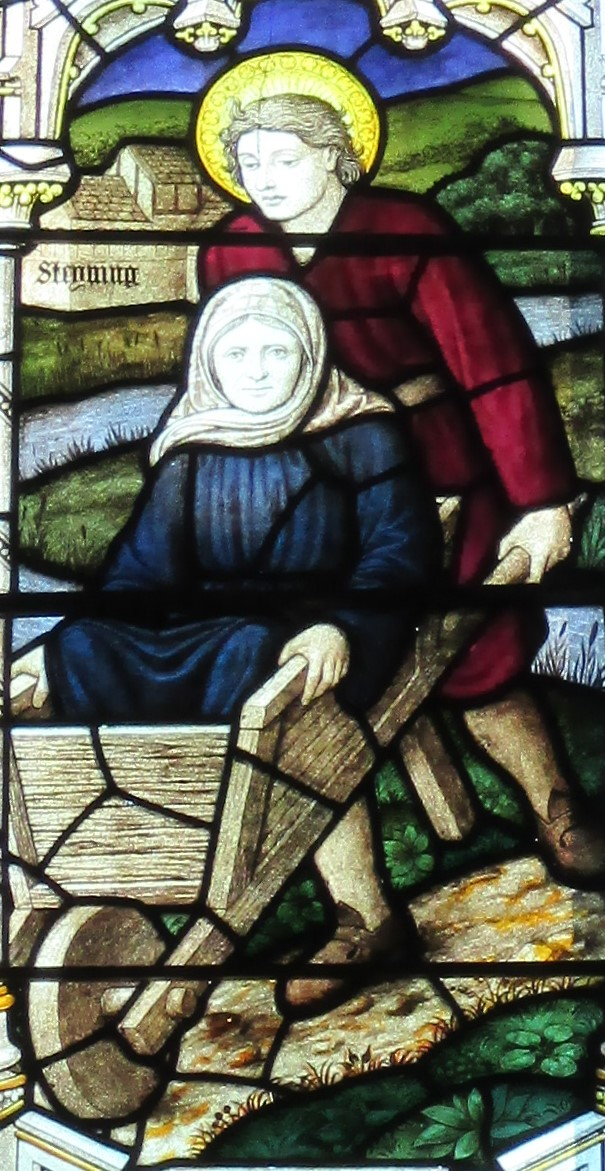
St Cuthmann and his mother in St Swithun's Church, East Grinstead

== See also ==
- History of Christianity in Sussex

== Bibliography ==
- Acta Sanctorum February volume II, Feb. 8th, p.197-199 (in Latin)
- G. R. Stephens, W. D. Stephens, "Cuthman: A Neglected Saint", Speculum, Vol. 13, No. 4 (October, 1938), pp. 448–453
- C. Grant Loomis, "The American Tall Tale and the Miraculous", California Folklore Quarterly, Vol. 4, No. 2 (April, 1945), page 119 – tells of Cuthmann hanging his gloves upon a sunbeam
