= Savoyard knights in the service of Edward I =

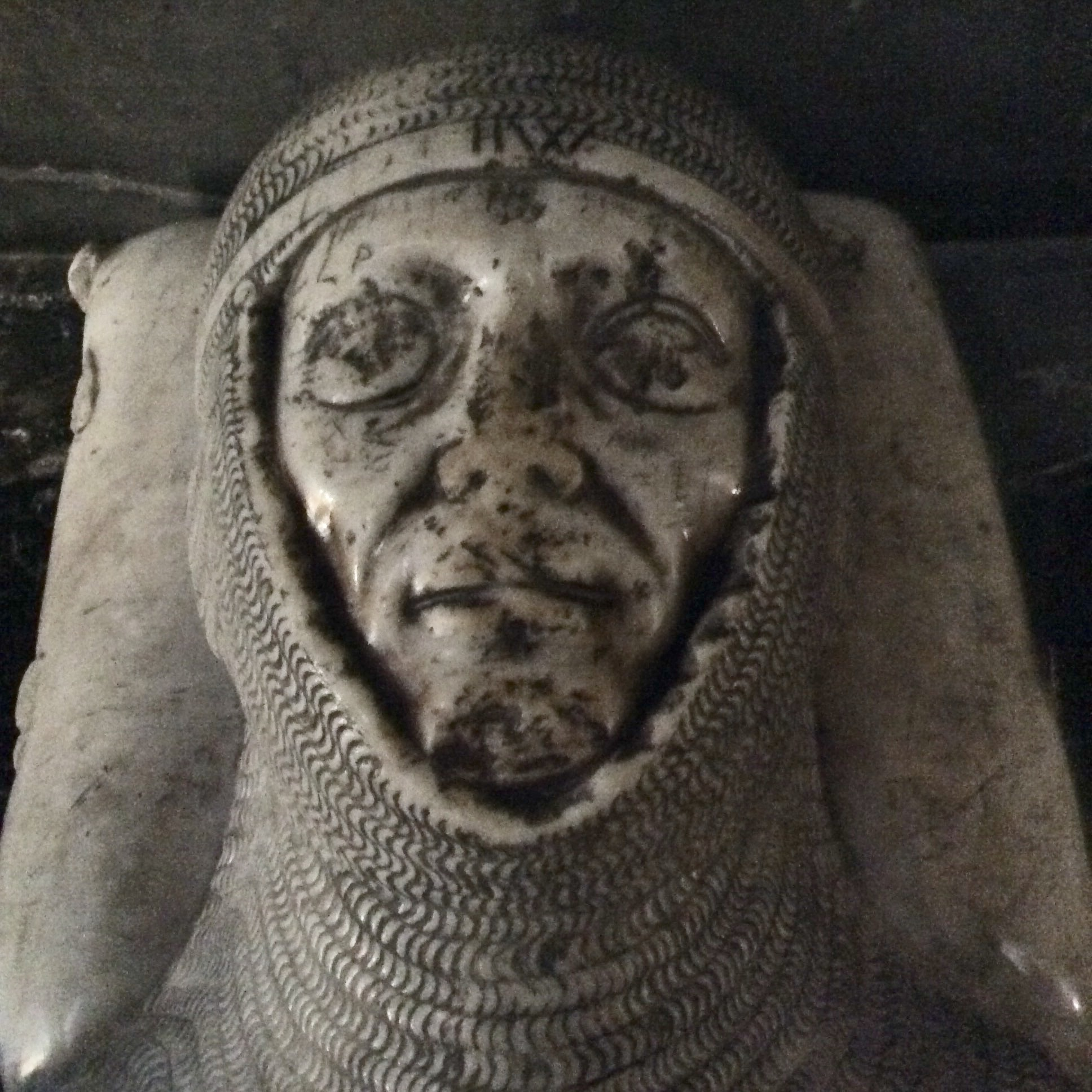
Detail of the tomb effigy of Otto de Grandson in the Lausanne Cathedral.

Edward I of England was associated with the Savoyard faction of nobles and knights who came from the County of Savoy, and were favoured in England. Savoy became linked to the Plantaganet monarchy of England with the marriage of Edward I's parents Henry III of England and Eleanor of Provence in 1236. Eleanor of Provence was the daughter of Beatrice of Savoy.

In 1252 Peter I, Count of Savoy introduced the son of Peter, Lord of Grandson to the English Court, Otto de Grandson. The young Otto became a childhood friend of the young English Prince Edward, later to become King Edward I. In 1268 both prince and servant were knighted and in 1271 the latter accompanied his lord on the Ninth Crusade, where he served at Acre that year. According to one source, it was Otto, not Eleanor of Castile, who sucked the poison from the wounded Edward after an attempted assassination. In 1272 Otto was appointed an executor in Acre.

Returning to England, Otto accompanied Edward in the Welsh Wars as his right-hand man, but also enlisted a whole retinue of fellow Savoyard knights in the service of the English crown. Knights from all over Savoy joined as household knights to King Edward I and were rewarded with key positions in the newly conquered Welsh lands.

== Sir Pierre de Champvent ==
Whilst prominent under Henry III of England, when he had apparently been in royal favour, he lost importance at the beginning of the rule of his son and successor King Edward I of England. However he took part in the campaigns to conquer Wales and eventually won the favour of Edward I. In the late 1280s, he was steward of the Household. He was personally invited to several parliaments by writ of summons, where he was responsible as steward for receiving petitions to the king. In 1292 he rose to Chamberlain of the Household. During the Welsh uprising from 1294 he was part of the king's entourage when he was briefly trapped in Conwy Castle by the rebels in early 1295. During the Franco-English War, he took part in the king's campaign in Flanders in 1297.

== Sir John de Bonvillars ==
Sir John de Bonvillars from Bonvillars close to Grandson, he was brother in law to Otto de Grandson. Knight of King Edward I's household and deputy Welsh Justicier to Otto from 1284 to 1287. On 2 April 1277 he was bearer of a letter to Otto who was besieging Dolforwyn Castle. Was at Chester in September 1277. Revisited Savoy in 1278, was at Evian on 22 March. With Otto de Grandson in Wales in 1282 when latter was commanding forces based on Montgomery. In 1283 was sent to Wales, in 1284 he was described as Otto's Knight Companion. Oversaw the construction of Conwy Castle. First Constable of Harlech Castle from 1285 to his death by drowning (probably during the siege of Dryslwyn Castle in South Wales) between July and November 1287. Married to Agnes de Bevillard (likely sister of Otto de Grandson) who held on to the Constable of Harlech role until succeeded by Master James of Savoy in 1290.

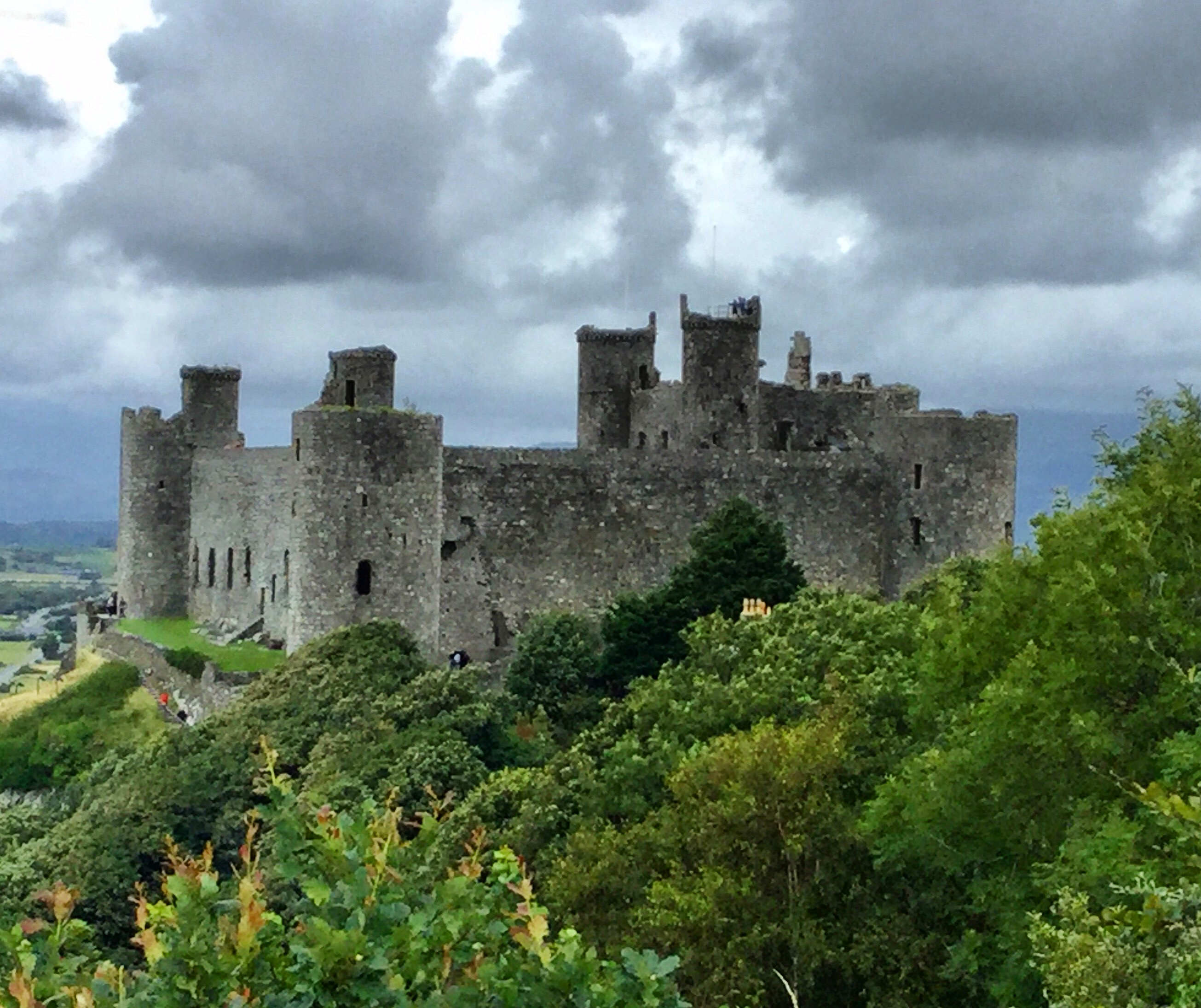
Harlech Castle.

== Sir William de Cicon ==
From Vanclans, 24 kilometres north of Pontarlier in the Jura. Introduced to King Edwards service by Otto de Grandson. First mentioned 13 November 1276 when he comes to England with a message from Otto de Grandson to King Edward I. With the army in South Wales in 1277. Constable of Rhuddlan Castle between February 1282 and May 1284 including the period of the Siege of Rhuddlan. First Constable of Conwy Castle from its construction until his death in 1310 or 1311.

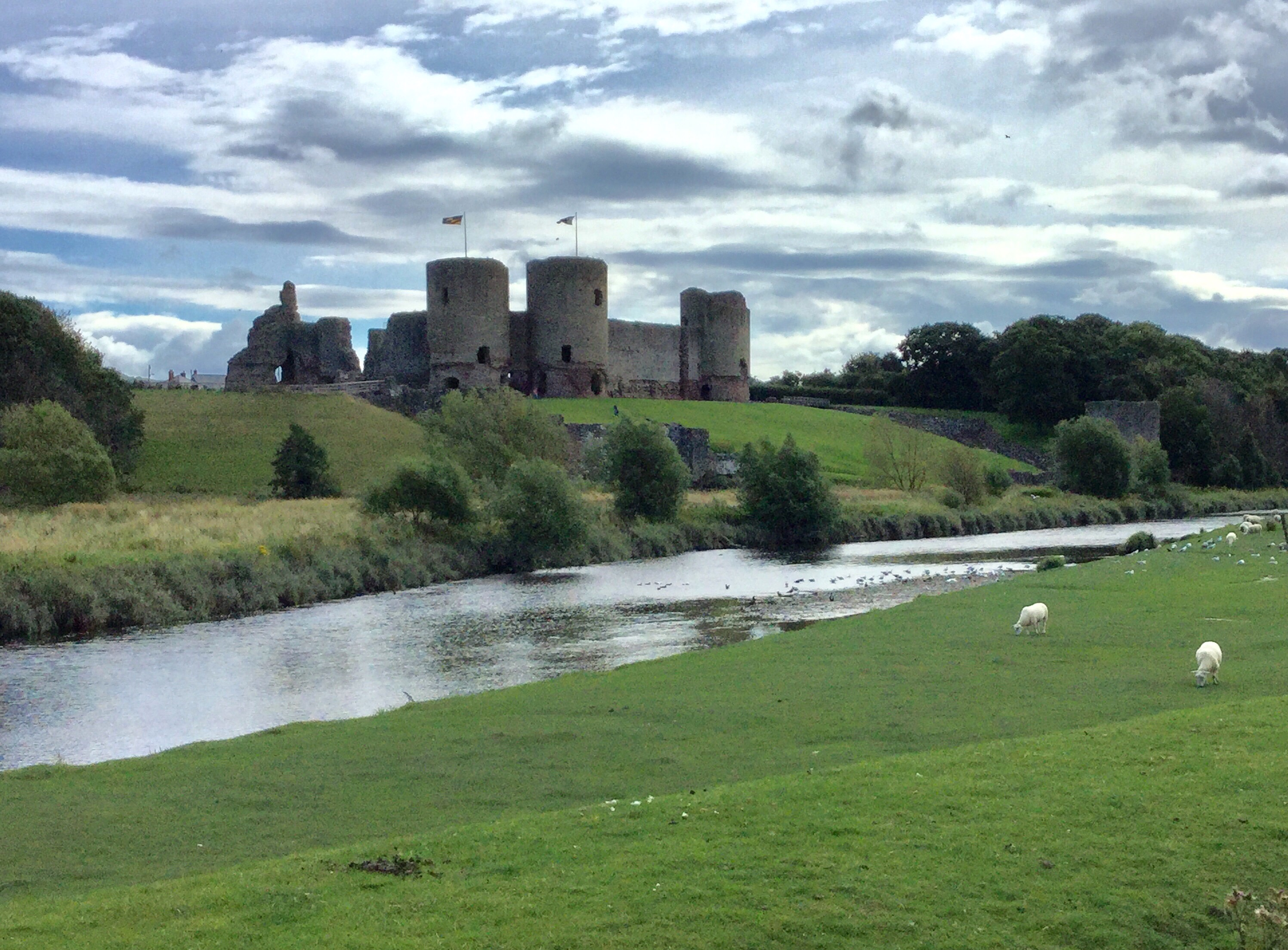
Rhuddlan Castle.

== Sir Gerard de St Laurent ==
Named for St Laurent of Jura. With King Edward I and Otto de Grandson on Crusade, in Acre from 1271 to 1272. One of King Edward I's inner circle. First Constable of Flint Castle from 1277 to 1281. Died in 1282 possibly in the Welsh attack on the Castle. Had been in Chillon during the 1260s.

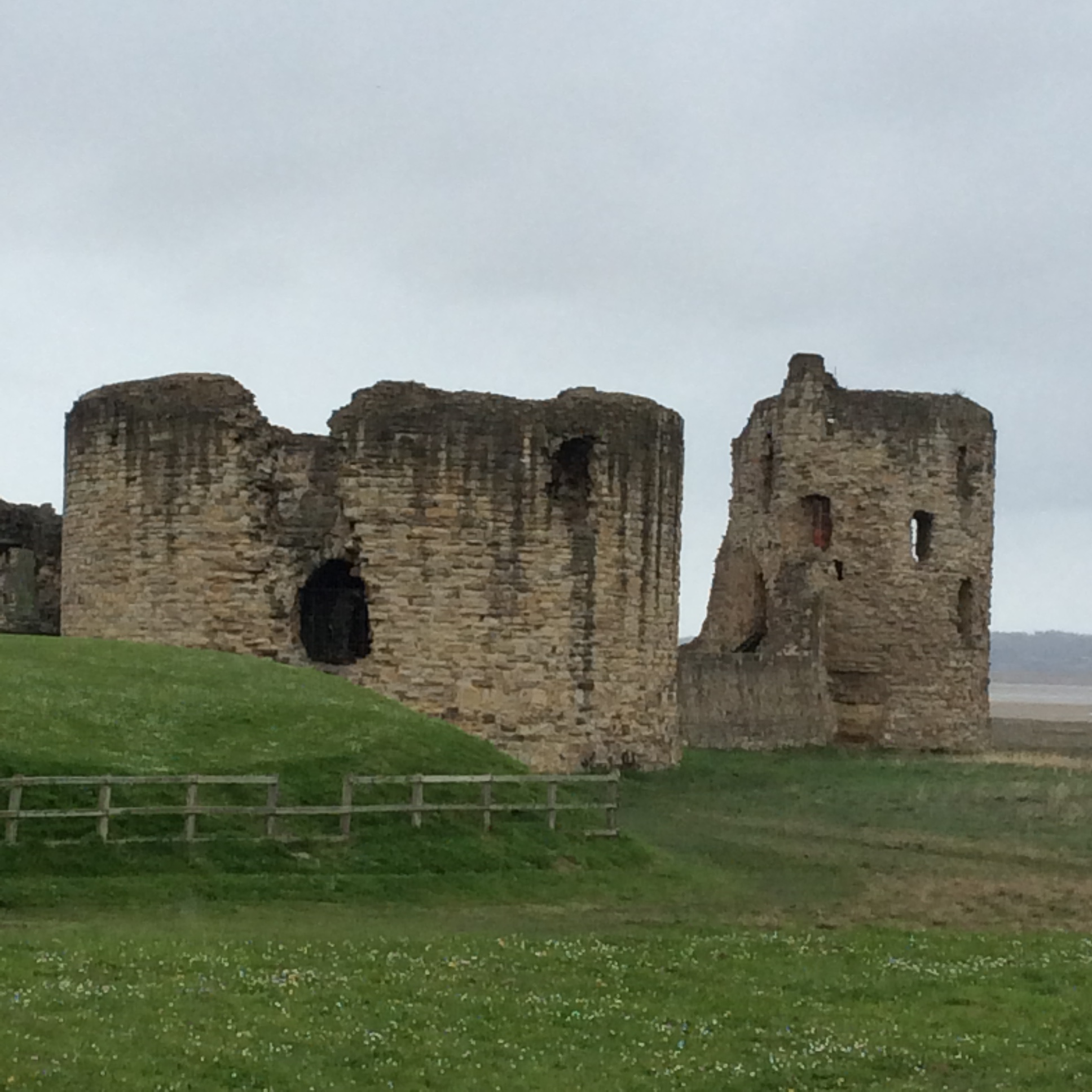
Flint Castle.

== William de Grandison, 1st Baron Grandison, Sir Guillaume de Grandson ==
Brother of Otto de Grandson, he was in the service of Edmund, Earl of Lancaster, who, on his behalf sent a letter to the king (when Guillaume's lands were seized, he being an alien), pointing out the undesirability of such seizures. He succeeded Sir John de Bonvillars as Deputy Justicier of Wales in 1288, serving as his brother's deputy until 1295. On 4 Nov 1288, he had letters of protection when remaining in Wales in order to fortify the castle of Caernarfon. He supervised construction of the castle at Caernarfon. He was summoned to Parliament from 6 Feb 1298/99 to Oct 1325, whereby he is held to have become Lord Grandison, he died in 1335.

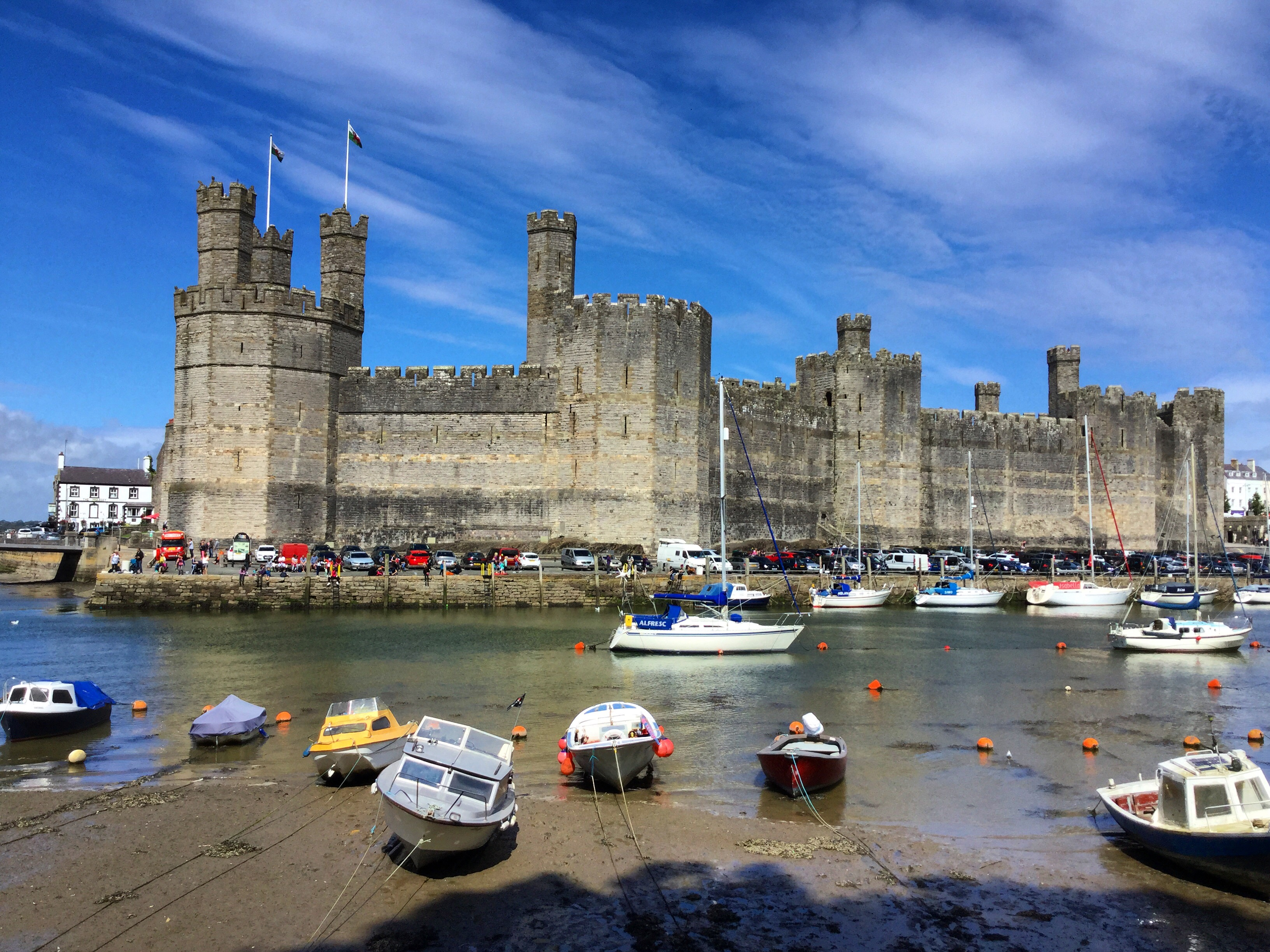
Caernarfon Castle.

== Sir Stephen de Rognon ==
Brother of Sir William de Cicon, was knighted by King Edward I in Wales in 1284.

== Summary ==
Along with Otto de Grandson the Savoyard knights of King Edward I of England fulfilled the roles of Justiciar of Wales, Deputy Justiciar of Wales, Constable of Flint Castle, Constable of Rhuddlan Castle, Constable of Conwy Castle and Constable of Harlech Castle.

== Bibliography ==
- Gravett, Christopher (2007). The Castles of King Edward I in Wales 1277–1307. Botley: Osprey Publishing. ISBN 978-1-78200-520-9.
- Hislop, Malcolm (2021). James of St George and the Castles of the Welsh Wars. Barnsley: Pen and Sword Books. ISBN 978-1-52674-130-1.
- Marshall, John (2025). Othon de Grandson: Edward I's Loyal Knight of Renown. Barnsley: Pen and Sword Books.
- Marshall, John (2022). Welsh Castle Builders. Barnsley: Pen and Sword Books. ISBN 978-1-39908-549-6.
- Taylor, Arnold. J (1963). Some notes on the Savoyards in North Wales, 1277-1300. With special reference to the Savoyard element in the construction of Harlech Castle. Genava 11. pp. 289–315.
- Taylor, Arnold (1985). Studies in Castles and Castle-Building. London: The Hambledon Press. ISBN 0-907628-51-6.
- Taylor, Arnold (1986). The Welsh Castles of Edward I. London: The Hambledon Press. ISBN 978-0-907628-712.
- Fryde, E. B. (1962). Book of Prests of the King's Wardrobe for 1294-5. Oxford: The Clarendon Press.
