= John de Bonvillars =

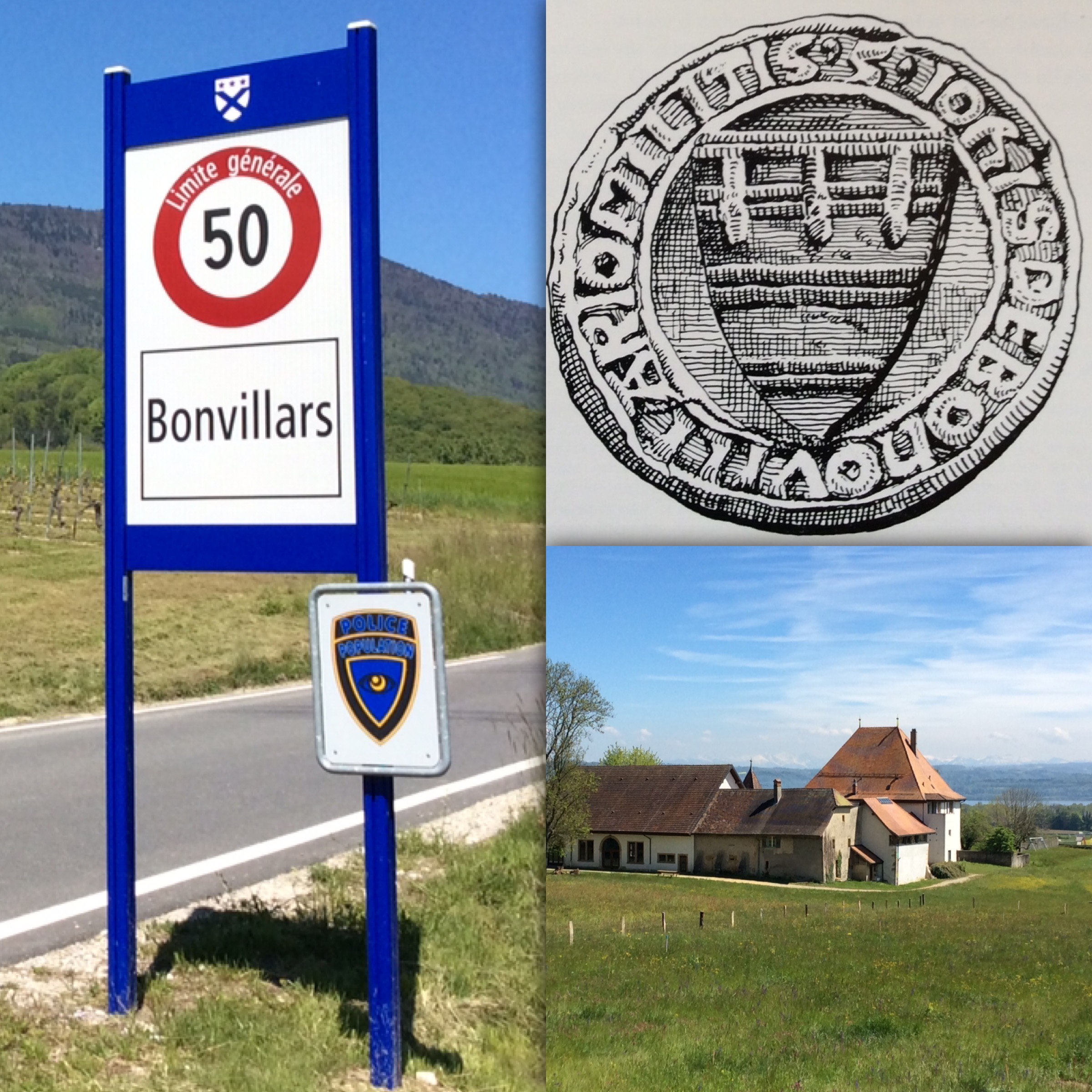
The Bonvillars Coat of Arms and Bonvillars today.

Sir John de Bonvillars (c. ?–1287) was a medieval Savoyard knight in the service of Edward I. He was the brother in law of Otto de Grandson, and like William de Cicon, had been introduced to English service by Otto.

From Bonvillars in Savoy, now the Canton of Vaud in Switzerland, close to Grandson Castle, he was brother-in-law to Otto de Grandson. Knight of King Edward I's household and deputy Welsh Justicier to Otto de Grandson from 1284 to 1287. On 2 April 1277 he was bearer of a letter to Otto de Grandson who was besieging Dolforwyn Castle. Was at Chester in September 1277. Revisited Savoy in 1278, was at Evian on 22 March 1279. With Otto in Wales in 1282 when latter was commanding forces based on Montgomery. In 1283 was sent to Wales, in 1284 he was described as Otto de Grandson's Knight Companion.

Bonvillars oversaw the construction of Conwy Castle. First Constable of Harlech Castle from 1285 to his death by drowning (probably during siege of Dryslwyn in South Wales) between July and November 1287. Married to Agnes de Bevillard (likely sister of Otto de Grandson) who held on to the Constable of Harlech role until succeeded by James of Saint George in 1290.
