= Otto of Grandson =

Otto of Grandson may refer to:

- Otto I of Grandson (died 1328), a knight in the service of the English crown.
- Otto of Grandson (died 1309), Prince-Bishop of Basel.
