= Guillaume de Champvent =

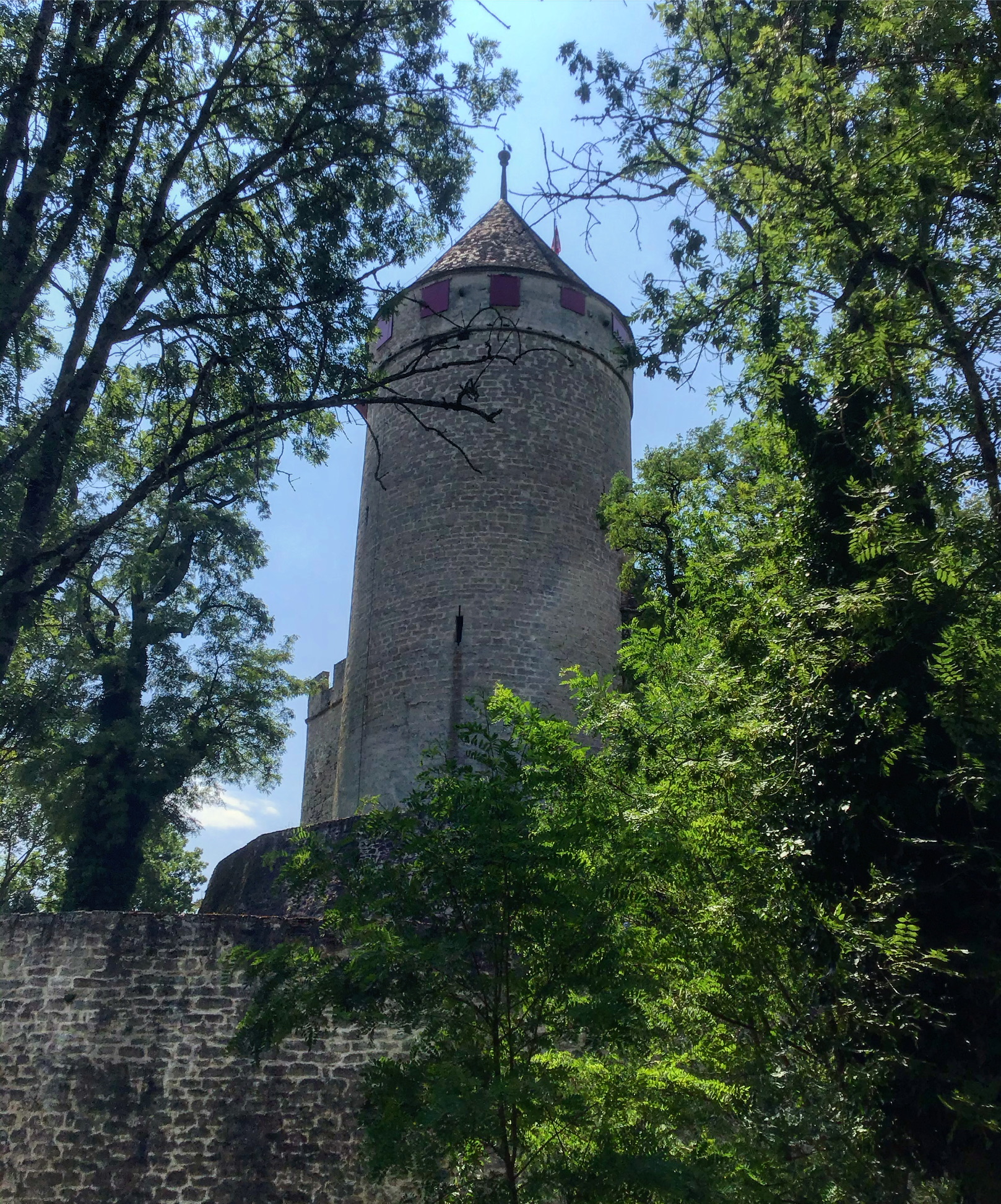
Episcopal Château de Lucens

William of Champvent or Guillaume de Champvent (c.1239 – 21 March 1301) was the son of Henri, Lord of Champvent, brother of Othon de Champvent and Pierre de Champvent, cousin of Otto de Grandson. He followed Peter II, Count of Savoy to England and served King Henry III of England as a diplomat. His church career in England, being a dean of St. Martin's Le Grand in London from 1262. His influence at court in 1262 is evidenced by his joining the Savoyard witness list for a charter relating to Queen Alianor’s dowry. Upon his departure back to Lausanne Edward I of England would appoint Louis I of Vaud to St. Martin's Le Grand

He was elected Bishop of Lausanne in 1273, he initiated a vigorous policy of restoring the rights of his Church, which set him against Savoy and the bourgeoisie of Lausanne, a policy he led by relying on the Empire. He participated with Edward I of England in the succession to Philip I, Count of Savoy in 1285 which led to the creation of the Barony of Vaud, entrusted to Louis I of Vaud. He built the episcopal castles of Bulle and Lucens; he acquired that of Glérolles. In 1275 took place the consecration of the Lausanne Cathedral by Pope Gregory X.
