= Dolforwyn Castle =

Grade I listed building in Powys. Castle

- Castell Dolforwyn (Welsh) (Note: Since 2024, Cadw, who maintain the site, use the Welsh name only.)
- Abermule, Powys
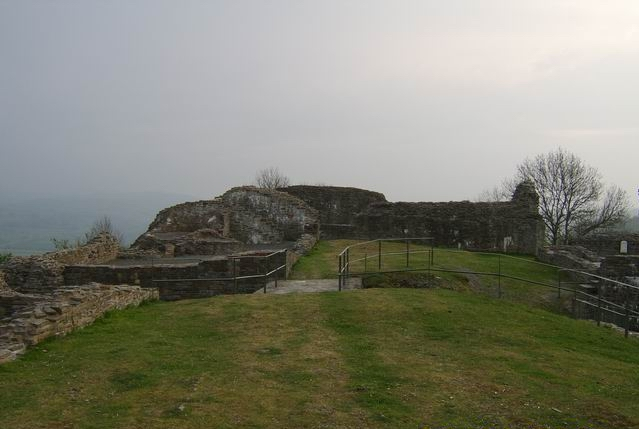
- Inner wards of Dolforwyn Castle, c.2007.

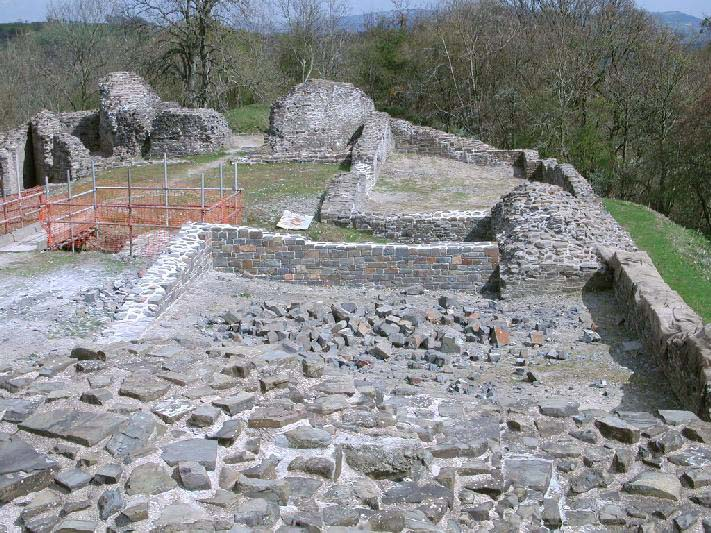
- A view towards the castle inner ranges and NE round tower.

Site information
- Type: Welsh Enclosure castle
- Controlled by: Cadw
- Open to the public: Yes
- Condition: Ruined
- Website: Castell Dolforwyn (Cadw)

Location
- Location in Wales
- Coordinates: 52.5462°N 3.252°W

Site history
- Built: 1273 - 1277
- Built by: Llywelyn ap Gruffudd
- Materials: Stone
- Events: Welsh Wars

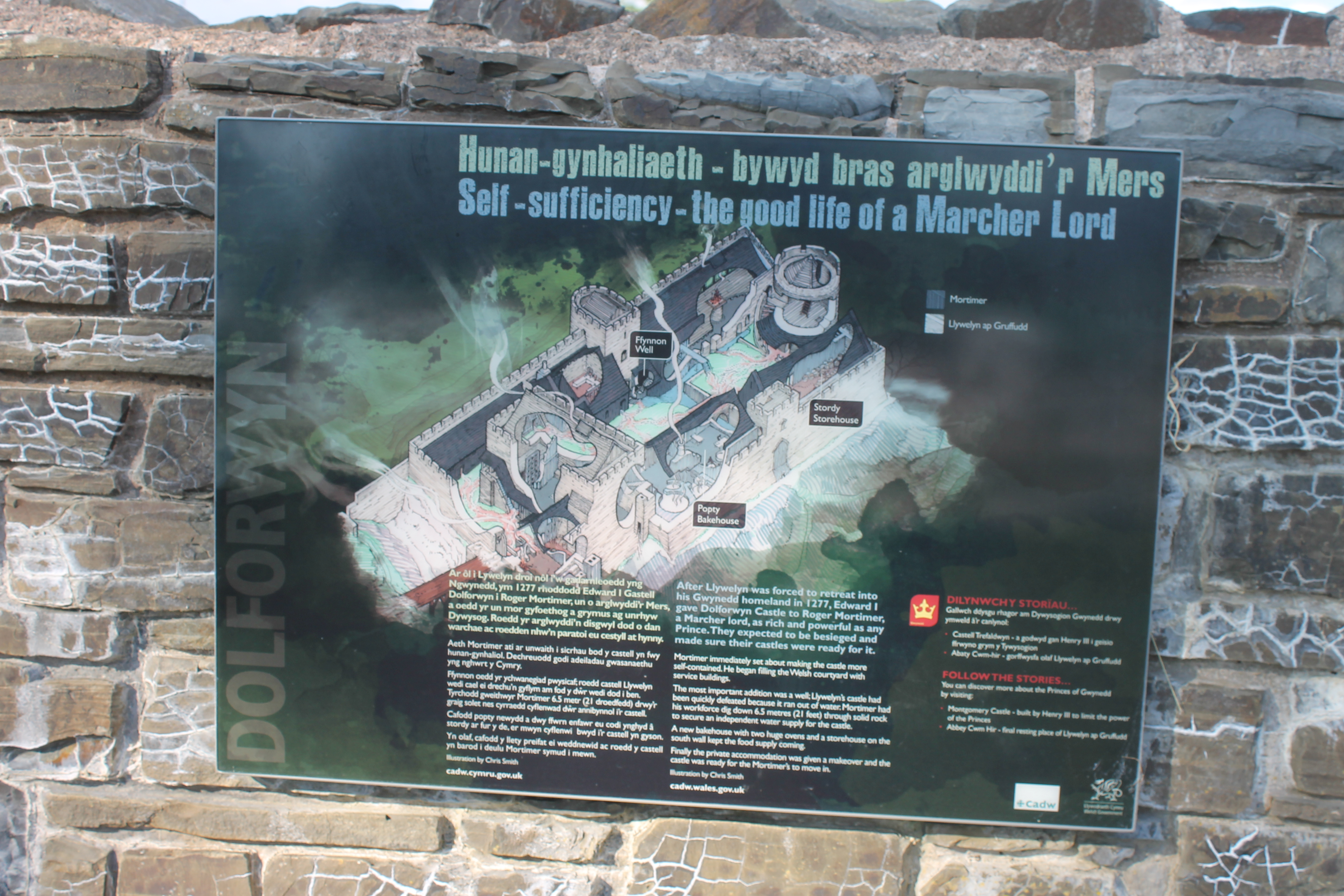
A reconstructed view Dolforwyn Castle.

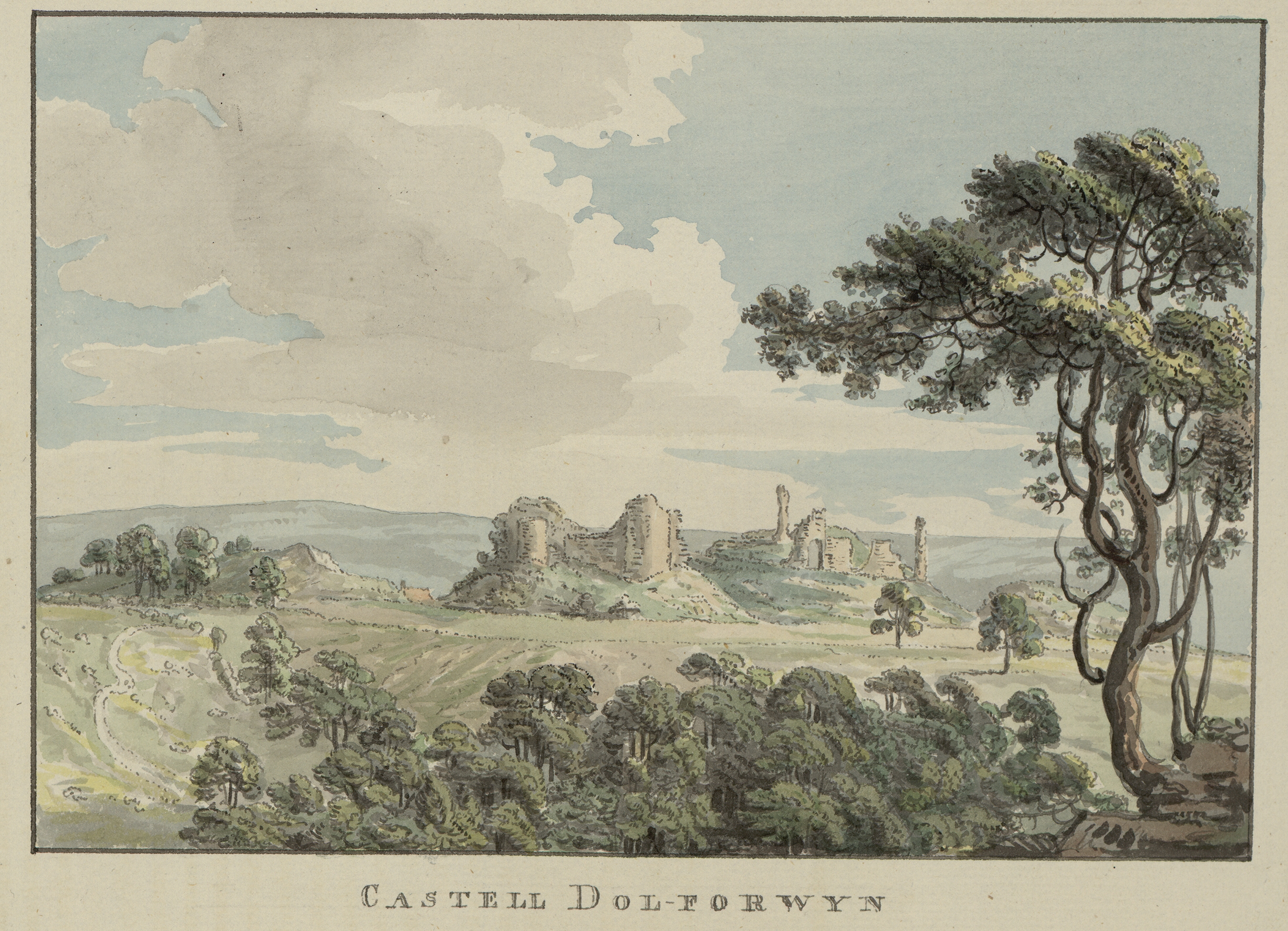
Dolforwyn c.1781

Dolforwyn Castle (Welsh: Castell Dolforwyn) is a Welsh medieval castle above the village of Abermule, Powys. The fortification was established by Llywelyn ap Gruffudd, Prince of Gwynedd in the late 13th century. It is sited on a wooded ridge commanding excellent views of the upper Severn Valley.

Dolforwyn Castle is a fine example of a native Welsh castle design as opposed to those built by the Cambro-Normans during the Norman invasion of Wales.

== History ==
=== Welsh construction ===
The main land holdings of Llywelyn ap Gruffudd, Prince of Gwynedd lay in Gwynedd. In order to assert his claim to be the most important of the Welsh princes, he felt the need to exercise his authority in the strategic area of the Severn Valley, giving access to the heartlands of Wales. In 1257 he invaded the area, and by 1263 he had captured the districts known as Cedewain and Ceri. As a result of this Henry III recognised Llywelyn as Prince of Wales under the terms of the Treaty of Montgomery of 19 September 1267. In order to consolidate his newly conquered lands and to affirm his control, Llywelyn constructed the castle at Dolforwyn between 1273 and 1277, for a recorded cost of £174 6s 8d.

The castle was fairly primitive in its concept compared to some structures to be found elsewhere. A rectangular platform was hewn from the rock some 240 feet by 90 feet, and the initial castle consisted of a rectangular keep at the south west end of the platform and a circular tower at the opposite end. The two structures were subsequently connected by ramparts, to make a rectangular enclosure with a D-shaped tower on the northern wall. The enclosed area was divided into two wards by a rock-cut ditch. A two-storey structure was built against the north wall. The main gateway into the castle was in the west wall. A smaller entrance was sited in the south wall.

=== Capture ===
Following the construction of the castle without the authorisation of the new English king Edward I, whose frontier post was at Montgomery Castle, tensions grew between the king, Llywelyn ap Gruffydd, and Gruffydd ap Gwenwynwyn, Prince of Southern Powys, who held Powis Castle at nearby Welshpool.

In 1277, shortly after the castle had been completed, Roger Mortimer, Henry de Lacy, Earl of Lincoln and Otto de Grandson besieged it. It fell on 8 April 1277 because no well had been constructed and the occupants ran out of water.

The siege is important because it may well point to the appointment of James of Saint George as castle builder for Edward I. A letter attributed to either Henry de Lacy, Earl of Lincoln or Otto de Grandson from Dolforwyn Castle is considered to have been instrumental in bringing Master James of Saint George to Wales: the man who would later build Flint Castle, Rhuddlan Castle, Conwy Castle, Caernarfon Castle, Harlech Castle and Beaumaris Castle.

Custody was first given to Gruffydd ap Gwenwynwyn but subsequently to Roger Mortimer along with the lands of Ceri and Cedewain. Following its fall, the castle design was modified by its new English overlords. The south gate was blocked, new buildings were set up in the courtyard, and a well was dug.

Following the death of Roger Mortimer in 1282, the castle passed to his son Edmund Mortimer, then to his son, Roger Mortimer, 1st Earl of March, who lost the family estates in 1322 after an act of treason. An inventory taken at the time recites the rooms, which included an armoury in the round tower as well as domestic ranges with a pantry, buttery, kitchen, brewhouse, bakehouse, chapel, hall, a lady's chamber and two granges for the storage of grain.

=== Later years ===
Dolforwyn appears to have been occupied until the reign of Richard II (1377–99), but by 1381 it was already described as being in poor repair, and in 1398 it was described as being "ruinous and worth nothing." It appears that after this date the castle was almost lost from memory and attracted little interest.

The ownership of the castle passed to the Earls of Powis and was subsequently bought by the grandfather of the antiquarian John Davies Knatchbull Lloyd, who gave the site to the Welsh Ancient Monuments Board (now Cadw) in 1955. Cadw arranged for excavation of the site between 1981 and 2002 and the monument is now open to the public.

In June 2009 Cadw commenced a 6-month process of consolidation of the castle masonry.

Since 2024, Cadw have used the Welsh name Castell Dolforwyn in English, as part of an effort to standardise the names in both languages.

== Literary associations ==
The name "Dôl-forwyn" literally translates as 'maiden's meadow' and according to the antiquarian Thomas Pennant, Welsh folklore states that this is the place where the legendary Princess Habren was drowned in the Afon Hafren (river severn), giving her name to the river.

Bernard Cornwell, as part of The Warlord Chronicles, depicts Dolforwyn as a fictional iron age hillfort in his 1995 book The Winter King.

== Study ==
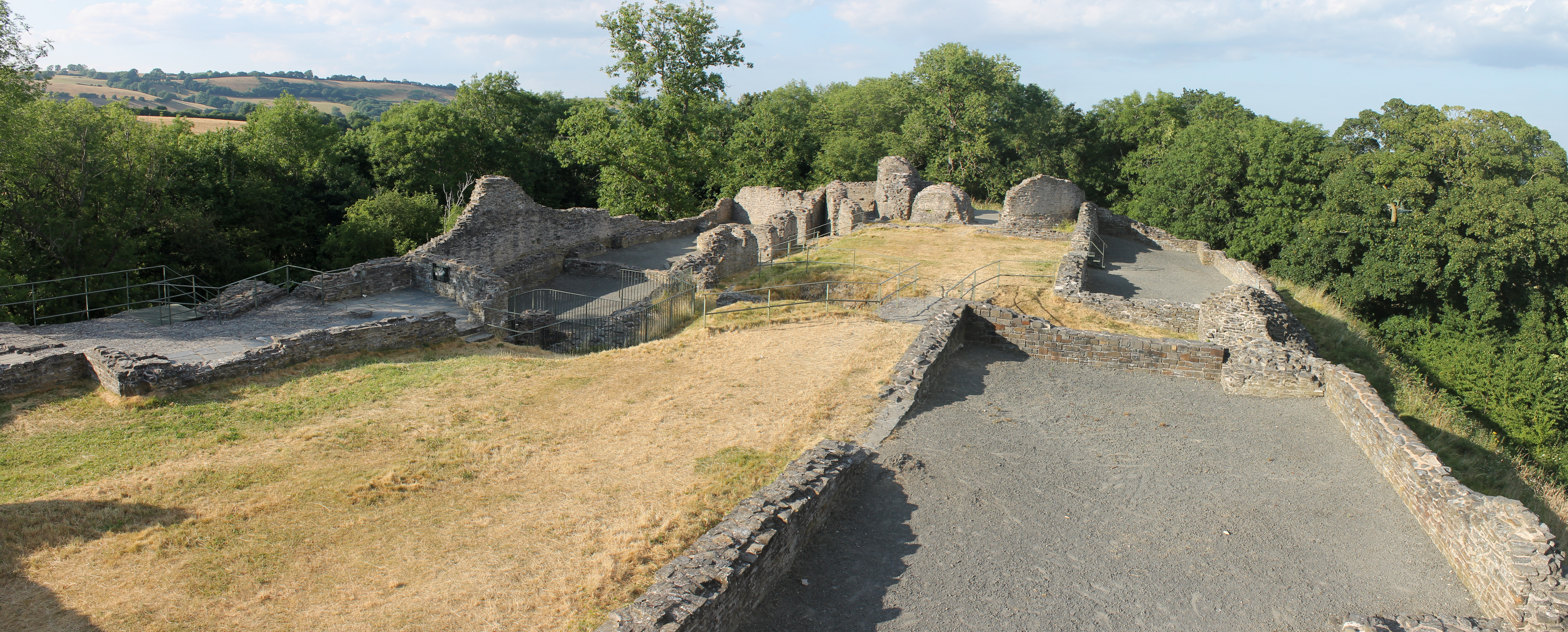
Dolforwyn Castle, Powys, Wales

The entire site of Dolforwyn Castle was archaeologically excavated between 1981 and 2002 as a joint project between the University of Leeds (1981–1985), University of York (1986–2002), and Cadw. Over the course of three decades, students and Cadw employees spent three or four weeks each summer examining specific parts of the castle. The work was under the directorship of Dr Lawrence Butler. The site was also rendered by a team of local masons employed by Cadw.

Finds from these excavations included part of a leather book cover, a small die, a silver coin from the reign of Edward II and a large array of spent stone catapult balls from the English siege of 1277. In the course of the excavations, more than 15 m (49 ft) of debris and infill was removed to reach the castle's features. These included a small stone lined hall, English repairs to Welsh masonry (shown by different types of mortar), a suspected wheat-drying oven and a 6 m (20 ft) cistern/cellar well (with indication it might be deeper).

== See also ==
Other examples of the castles of the Welsh princes are:

- Castell Dinas Brân
- Castell y Bere
- Dolwyddelan Castle
- Dolbadarn Castle
