= William de Cicon =

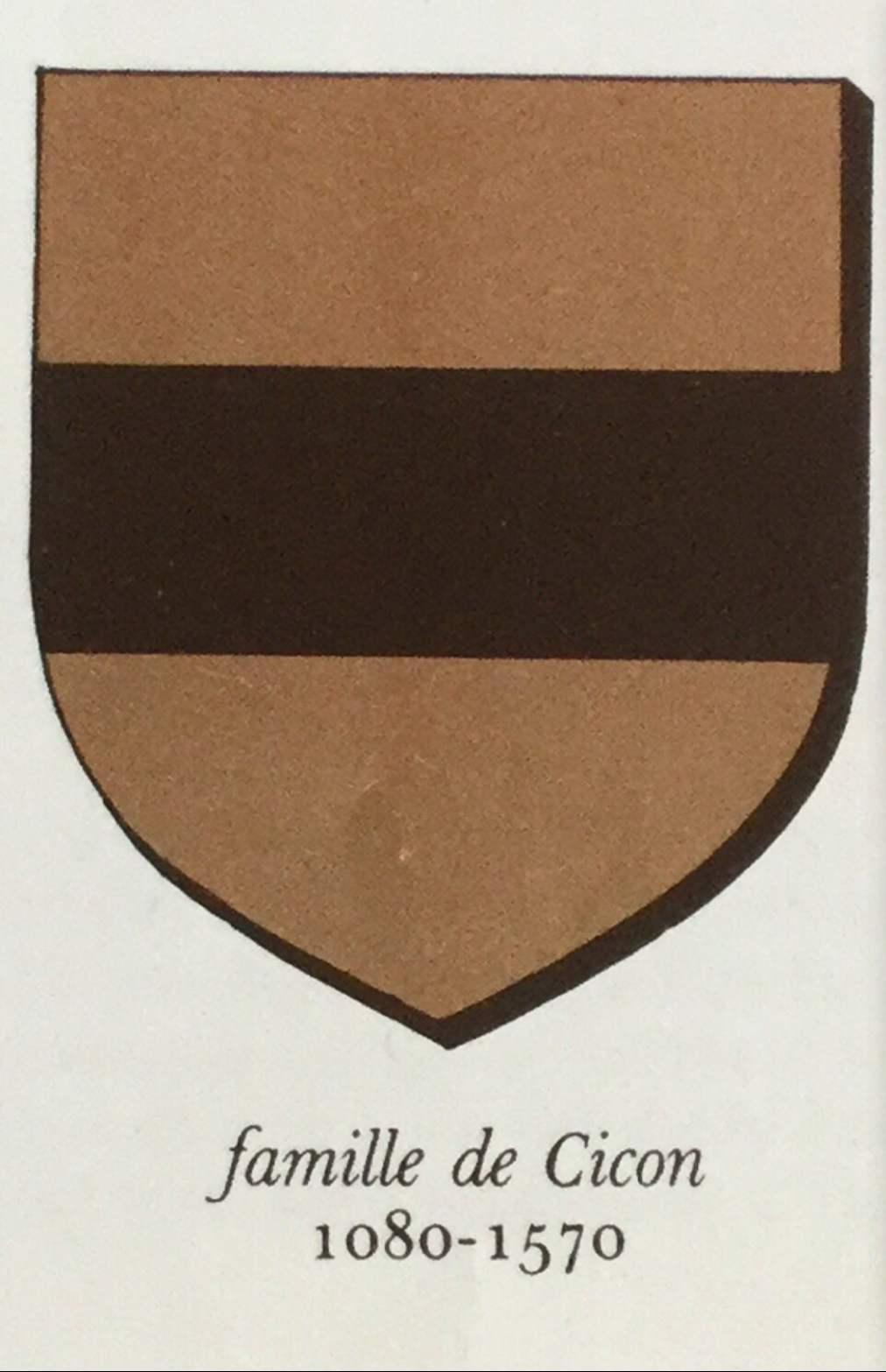
Famille de Cicon Heraldry

== Sir William de Cicon ==
Guillaume de Cicon appears in the English archives variously as; Cykun, Cycons, Chycun, Sicoms, Sicun, Sycun.

From Vanclans, 24 kilometres north of Pontarlier in the Jura. Introduced to King Edwards service by Otto de Grandson.

An ancestor of Cicon's had been with the Fourth Crusade that had sacked Constantinople in 1204, one Othon de Cicon. Othon de Cicon had accompanied his uncle Othon de la Roche (who became Duc d’Athènes and built a Frankish tower atop the Acropolis) on the fourth crusade, and became lord of Karystos from 1250 (at least) to his death around 1266. Guillaume de Cicon's first arrival in the English record of 13 November 1276 follows closely on the heels of the recapture of Karystos by the Byzantines under Licario also in 1276.

First mentioned 13 November 1276 when he comes to England with a message from Otto de Grandson to King Edward I. With the army in South Wales in 1277. Constable of Rhuddlan Castle between February 1282 and May 1284 including the period of the Siege of Rhuddlan. First Constable of Conwy Castle from its construction until his death in 1310 or 1311.

His appointment at Conwy Castle was recorded

“The king has committed in like manner to William de Cycun [Guillaume de Cicon], the castle of Aberconewey [Conwy], with the armour, etc, and has granted to him 190 livres yearly for the custody thereof, to be received as above, on condition that he shall have continuously have in garrison, in addition to himself and his household, at his cost thirty fencible men, of whom fifteen shall be crossbowmen one chaplain, one artiller, a carpenter, a mason and a smith, and of the others shall be made janitors, watchmen and other ministers of the castle. Order is given to all bailiffs etc (as above).”

In the winter of 1294-5 Cicon held Conwy Castle alongside King Edward I whilst under siege during the rebellion of Madog ap Llywelyn.
