= Pierre de Champvent =

Savoyard knight and courtier in England (died c. 1302)

Arms of Peter de Chauvent, Baron Chauvent: Paly of six argent and azure, a fess gules.

Pierre de Champvent (also Peter de Chauvant or Chauvent) († between September 1302 and March 29, 1303) was a noble originally from Savoy who made a career as a military and courtier in England.

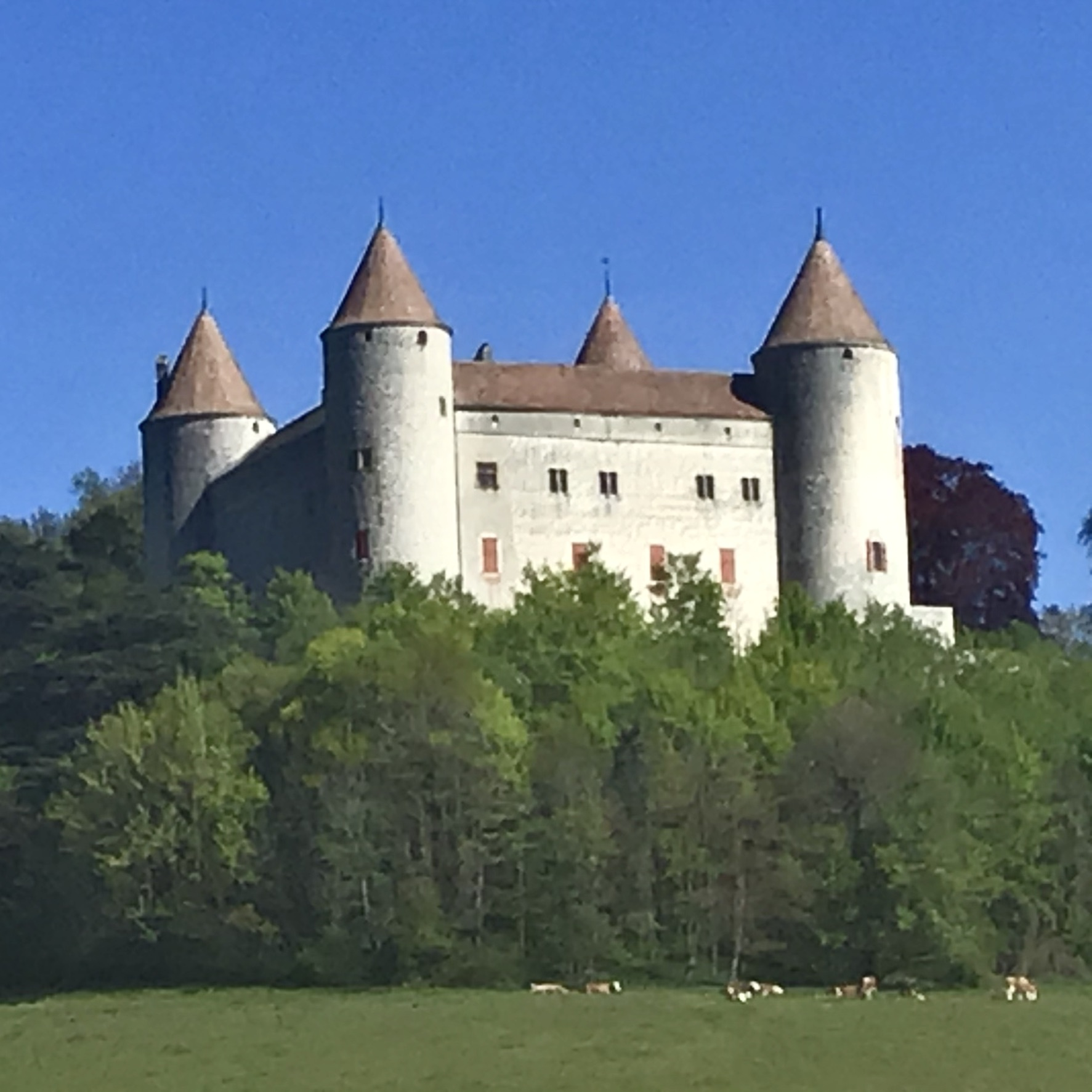
Château de Champvent near Grandson, Switzerland

== Origin and move to England ==
Pierre de Champvent came from the Champvent family, a noble family from Vaud, which was under the influence of the county of Savoy in the 13th century. He was a son of Henri, Lord of Champvent, and his brothers were Guillaume and Othon de Champvent, who both later became bishops of Lausanne. Like his brothers, Pierre probably came to England with his uncle Pierre de Grandson and his cousin Otto de Grandson in the entourage of Peter II, Count of Savoy, an uncle of Queen Eleanor of Provence.

== Rise under Henry III ==
Champvent is first mentioned in England in 1252. Serving as a steward at the court of King Henry III of England. Before 1259 he was knighted. His influence at court in 1262 is evidenced by his joining the Savoyard witness list for a charter relating to Queen Alianor's dowry. As a knight of the royal household, he took part in the capture of Northampton in 1264 and in the siege of Kenilworth Castle in 1266 during the Second Barons' War. He brought additional artillery for the siege to Kenilworth from Nottingham Castle, “one ballistam de trullio and four balistas ad duas pedes”

In 1269 he served as Sheriff of Gloucestershire and the constable of Gloucester Castle. The king rewarded him with land ownership, two guardianship administrations and other privileges. In Vaud, after the death of his father before 1264, he inherited the Champvent lordship, which he had managed by castellans while he was away in England. There it is only occasionally documented, but probably during his reign, Champvent Castle was built towards the end of the 13th century based on the model of Yverdon-les-Bains Castle which had been the first castle built by the famous Savoyard master mason James of Saint George.

== Further advancement under Edward I ==
While Champvent under Henry III had apparently been in royal favor, it lost importance at the beginning of the rule of his son and successor King Edward I of England. He took part in the conquest of Wales and eventually won the favour of Edward I. In the late 1280s, he was steward of the Household. He was personally invited to several parliaments by writ of summons, where he was responsible as steward for receiving petitions to the king. In 1292 he rose to Chamberlain of the Household. During the Welsh uprising from 1294 he was part of the king's entourage when he was briefly trapped in Conwy Castle by the rebels in early 1295. During the Franco-English War, he took part in the king's campaign in Flanders in 1297. The following year he fought at the Battle of Falkirk during the war with Scotland. In contrast to the rewards that Champvent received during the reign of Henry III. had received, Edward I's rewards of seven monetary gifts and a few other gifts were meager, although the king was generally not considered a generous ruler. However, through his contacts with other English nobles, he managed to further expand his land holdings, so that he eventually owned properties in Sussex, Cambridgeshire and other parts of England.

== Marriage and children ==
Champvent was married to an Agnes, who presumably also came from Savoy. He probably died in England. His heir became his son John, who, however, did not achieve the importance of his father and only played a minor role at the English court.

== Bibliography ==
- John Marshall. 2025. Otto de Grandson: Edward I’s Loyal Knight of Renown. Barnsley: Pen and Sword.
- Michael Ray. 2006. The Savoyard Cousins: A Comparison of the Careers and Relative Success of the Grandson (Grandison) and Champvent (Chavent) Families in England. The Antiquaries Journal 86
- Jean-Pierre Chapuisat. 1964. Au service de deux rois d’Angleterre au XIIIe siècle: Pierre de Champvent. Revue Historique Vaudoise 72: 157-75.
