= Otto de Grandson =

English Savoyard knight (c. 1238–1328)

Othon de Grandson
- Sheriff of Tipperary; Lord of the Channel Islands; Lieutenant of the Duchy of Gascony; Justiciar of North Wales; Baron Grandison
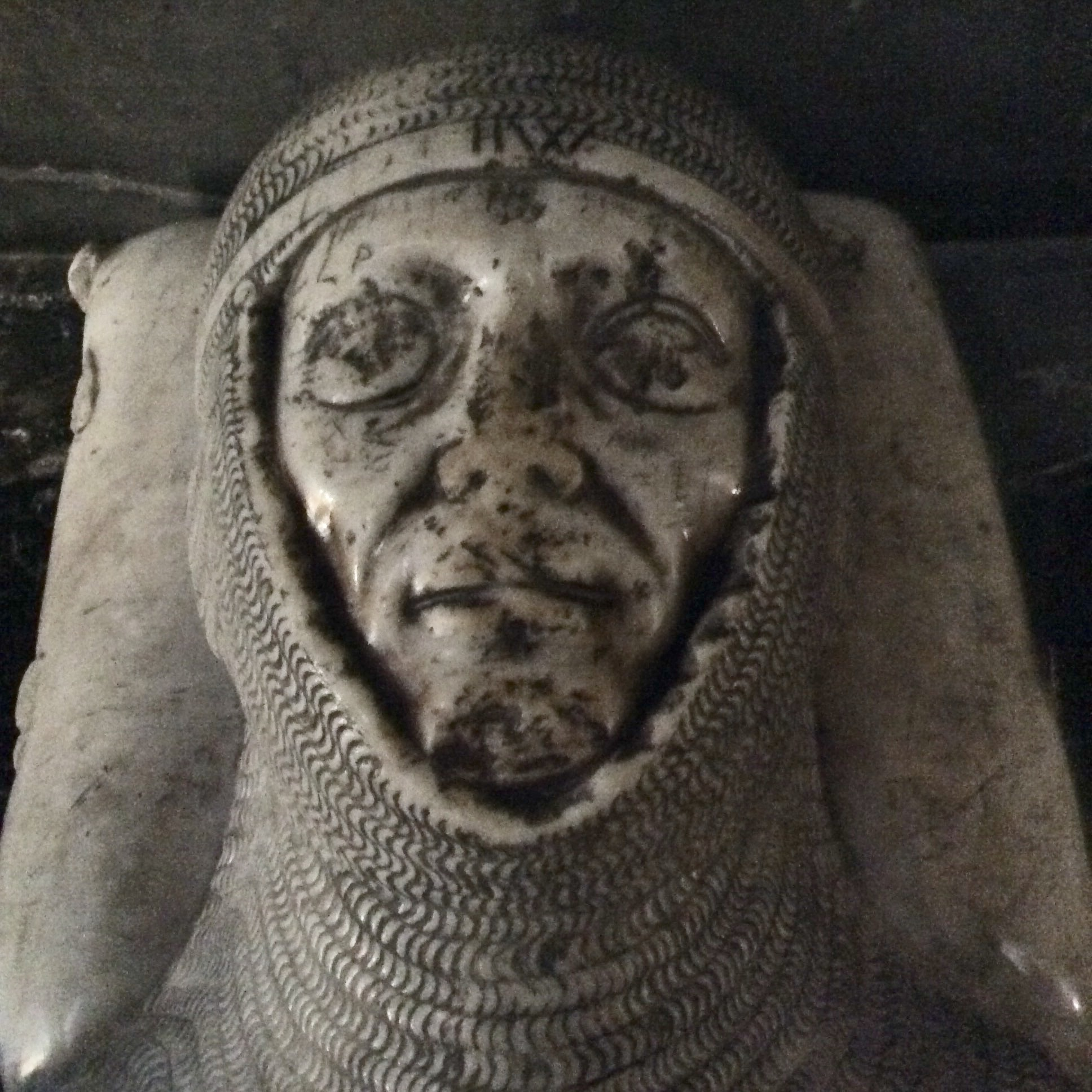
- Otto I de Grandson, detail from his effigy in Lausanne Cathedral
- Born: c. 1238; Lausanne, Savoy
- Died: 1328; Aigle, Savoy
- Buried: Lausanne Cathedral
- Wars and battles: Lord Edward's crusade First Welsh war 1276; Second Welsh war 1282; Siege of Acre (1291); Gascon campaign (1294–1303)
- Parents: Pierre de Grandson; Agnès de Neuchâtel

Arms of Otto Grandison, Baron Grandison: Paly of six argent and azure, on a bend gules three escallops or.

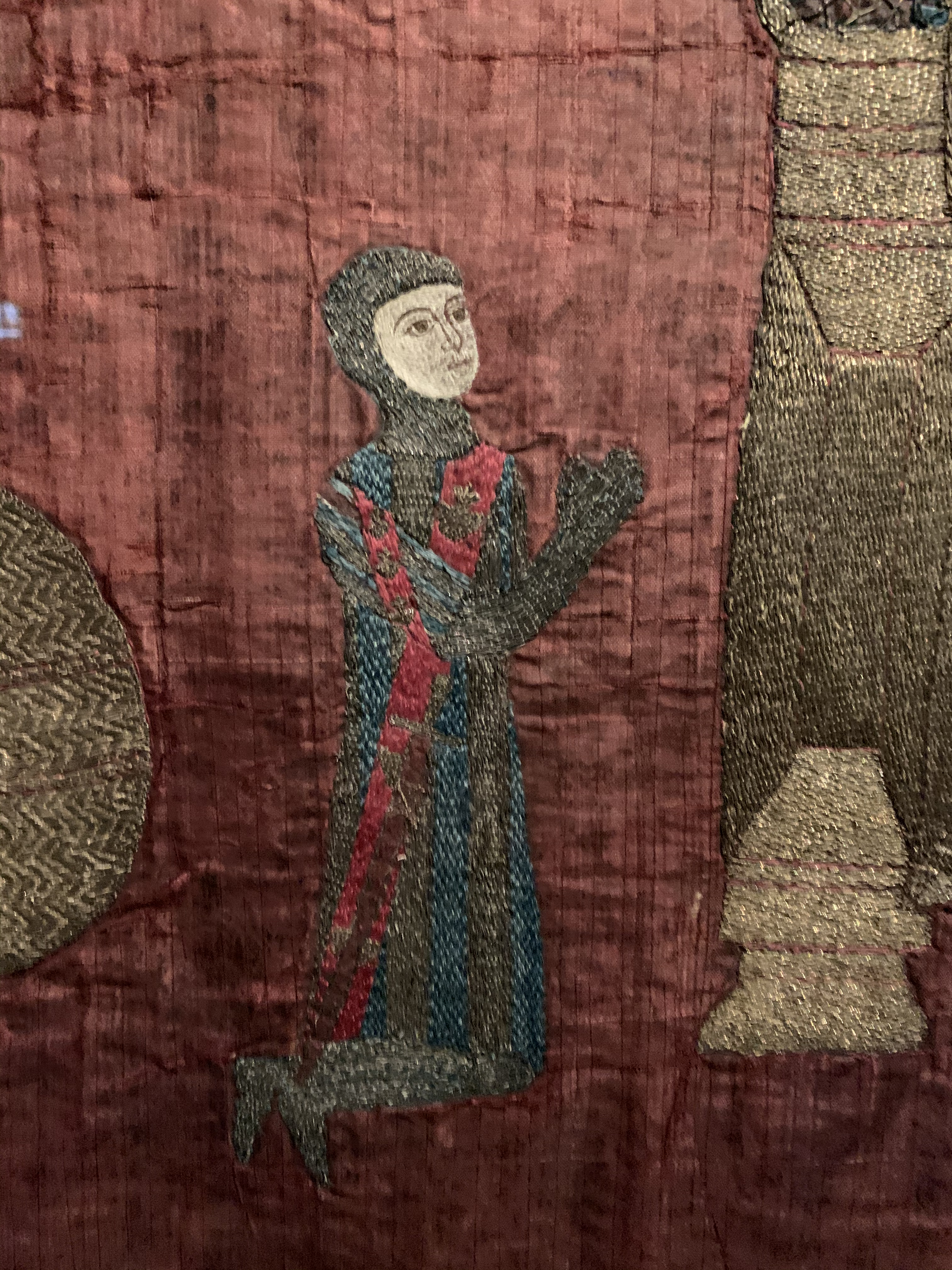
Othon de Grandson from an altar screen from the Cathedral in Lausanne now displayed in the Bern Historic Museum.

Otto de Grandson (Note: There are many variant spellings of his first and last names: Otton, Othon, Othon or Otes, and Grandison or Grandisson. The name he used himself was Othes, as recorded in a letter dated 16 January 1309. The modern spelling of the place after which he took this toponym is spelled Grandson. In English historiography, the French de ("of") is sometimes omitted (e.g., Otto Grandson). The Latinized form is de Grandisono.) (c. 1238–1328), sometimes numbered Otto I to distinguish him from later members of his family with the same name, was the most prominent of the Savoyard knights in the service of King Edward I of England, to whom he was the closest personal friend and many of whose interests he shared.

== Family ==
The son of Pierre, lord of Grandson near Lausanne and Agnès de Neuchâtel. He was the elder brother of William de Grandison, 1st Baron Grandison and future Bishops of Verdun Henri de Grandson and Gerard de Grandson, all of whom would join him in England, as would his cousins Pierre de Champvent and Guillaume de Champvent. His ancestor, Barthélémy de Jura, Bishop of Laon, attended the Council of Troyes (1129) which wrote the rule for the Knights Templar.

== Service in England and Wales (1265–90) ==
The young Otto travelled to England probably in the company of Peter II of Savoy by 1252, certainly not later than 1265. His father, a loyal ally of Peter was receiving payments from the English crown from 1245. There he entered the service of King Henry III and by 1267 was placed in the household of Prince Edward. In return for likely service for Prince Edward at the battles of Lewes and Evesham he was rewarded with property at Queenhithe in London. In 1268 both prince and servant were knighted and in 1271 the latter accompanied his lord on the Ninth Crusade, where he served at Acre that year. According to Jean d’Ypres, it was Otto, not Eleanor of Castile, who sucked the poison from the wounded Edward after an attempted assassination. In 1272 Otto was appointed an executor in Acre.

In 1277 he was appointed lord of the Channel Islands and in 1290 appointed a bailiff for Jersey and another for Guernsey, giving them civil powers to administer the islands. However, given his many duties for Edward, Grandson would be an absentee landlord. Those appointed by him receiving some criticism. Grandson would make only one certain visit to the islands, this in 1323.

Returning to England, he was a key household knight of King Edward I in his campaigns in Scotland and Wales, where he served as chief justiciar of Wales, based at Caernarfon Castle from 1284 to 1294 - although his time in Caernarfon was limited. During the Welsh Wars of King Edward I Otto was very active diplomatically and militarily, beginning with the siege of Dolforwyn Castle in April 1277. In a letter attributed to him from Dolforwyn Castle he may well have been instrumental in bringing Master James of Saint George to Wales - the man who would later build Flint Castle, Rhuddlan Castle, Conwy Castle, Caernarfon Castle, Harlech Castle and Beaumaris Castle. Indeed Grandson is recorded as directing early palisade works at Flint Castle. On behalf of Edward, he concluded the Treaty of Aberconwy in November that brought the invasion of Wales in 1277 to an end. In early 1278, he was sent to Gascony by Edward along with Robert Burnel, to reform the government - Grandson and Burnell were joint Lieutenants of Gascony from 7 February 1278 until September 1278. They appointed Jean I de Grailly as the new Seneschal and laid the foundations for the Treaty of Amiens sealed in 1279. He was also employed as a diplomat and gained contacts with most of the sovereigns of western Europe. During the second invasion of Wales in 1282–83 he narrowly escaped death at the battle of Moel-y-don before in April 1283 taking the town of Harlech at the head of 560 infantry. As a commander of the royal army that had begun the campaign from Anglesey he was amongst the first of Edward’s retinue to see the future castle sites at Caernarfon and Harlech. In 1283 he was briefly in the employ of Edmund Crouchback, the king's younger brother, for diplomatic work. It was said that no one could do the king's will better, including the king himself.

== Crusading years (1290–95) ==
King Edward I of England sent Otto to Acre in the Holy Land in 1290 along with some English knights. At the time of the fall of Acre (1291), he was the master of the English knights in Palestine. At Acre he saved the life of fellow Savoyard Jean I de Grailly, with whom he had served Edward in Gascony earlier. As the city fell to the Muslims he commandeered Venetian ships filling them with fleeing troops and the wounded Jean I de Grailly, Otto was the last to join them on board. There are conflicting accounts of Grandson’s conduct at Acre, but the only eyewitness account by the Templar of Tyre in his Gestes des Chiprois confirms:

"Then entered a great number of Saracen men on horseback, so much that Sir Jean de Grailly, and Sir Othon de Grandson, and the men of the King of France made great defence, so that there are assessed many wounded and dead; and Sir Jean de Grailly and Sir Othon de Grandson could no longer suffer the charge of the Saracens, and they departed from there and fled, and Sir Jean de Grailly was wounded."

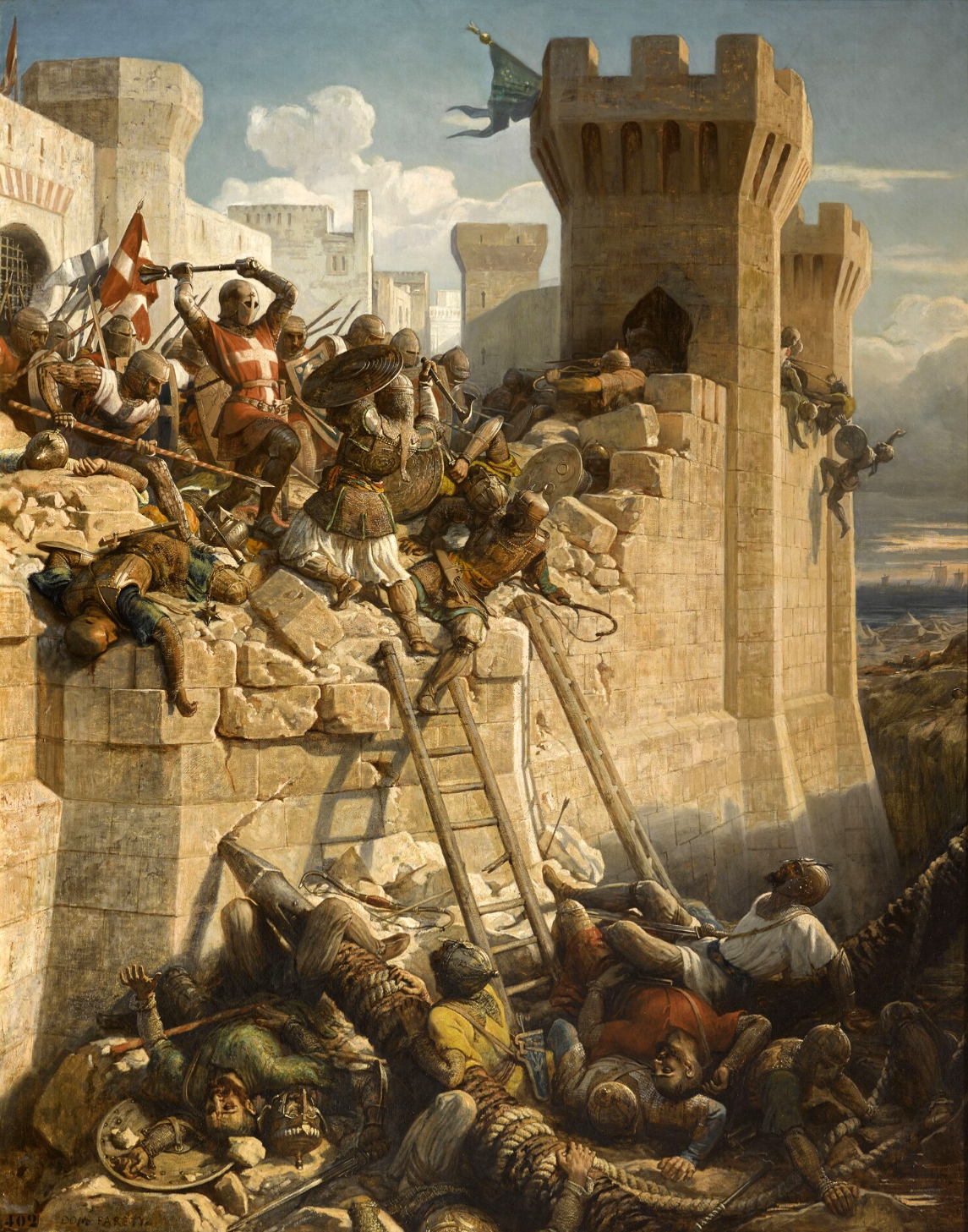
Siege of Acre, 1291

It is this account which is rendered by the renowned crusade historian Steven Runciman:

"On the eastern sector Jean de Grailly was wounded, but Othon de Grandson took control. He commandeered as many Venetian ships as he could find and placed Jean de Grailly and all soldiers he could rescue on board, and himself was the last to join them."

After the fall of the city he fled to Cyprus a poor man, but went on a subsequent pilgrimage to Jerusalem. In 1298 or 1299, Otto, Jacques de Molay of the Templars, and Guillaume de Villaret of the Hospitallers campaigned in Cilicia in order to fight off an invasion by the Mamluks. In his La flor des estoires d'Orient, the Armenian monk Hayton of Corycus mentions his activity on the mainland in Cilicia in 1298–1299: "Otto de Grandison and the Masters of the Temple and of the Hospitallers as well as their convents, who were at that time [1298 or 1299] in these regions [Cilician Armenia] . . .".

Otto has been hypothesised as the author of the Via ad Terram Sanctam, an Old French treatise on the recovery of the Holy Land. The hypothesis has been widely accepted, but has its detractors.

== Back in England and Diplomacy (1295–1307) ==
In 1294 Philip IV of France had confiscated Gascony from Edward I, leading to the Gascon War of 1294-1303. Following Grandson’s return to England from the Holy Land much of his time until the eventual peace of 1303 was taken up with diplomatic work at the French court and more often the Papal Curia in seeking a return of Gascony.

Amongst this diplomatic work was the need to build alliances for Edward against Philip, notably for Grandson the alliance he built with the nobles of the County of Burgundy who agreed in Brussels in the spring of 1297, to send five hundred cavalrymen to support the English in return for 60,000 livres in the first year of the war and 30,000 livres thereafter.

He was summoned to Parliament in 1299, which resulted in him becoming Baron Grandison.

In 1302 he was amongst the team of plenipotentiaries appointed by Edward I of England to negotiate the Treaty of Paris that returned the Duchy of Aquitaine to Edward.

== Return to the Continent (1307–28) ==
In 1307, on Edward's death, Otto left England permanently. He remained in the service of the crown for a while longer, however, for until 1317 he represented England at the Papal Curia. He was a benefactor of Vale Royal, an Edwardian foundation. The chronicler of Vale Royal described Grandson in these terms:

"Now there was at that time with the King a good and holy man, and a most strenuous knight in arms, named Otto de Grandison, whose memory be blessed for ever."

He founded a Franciscan friary in 1289 and a Carthusian monastery at La Lance in 1317.

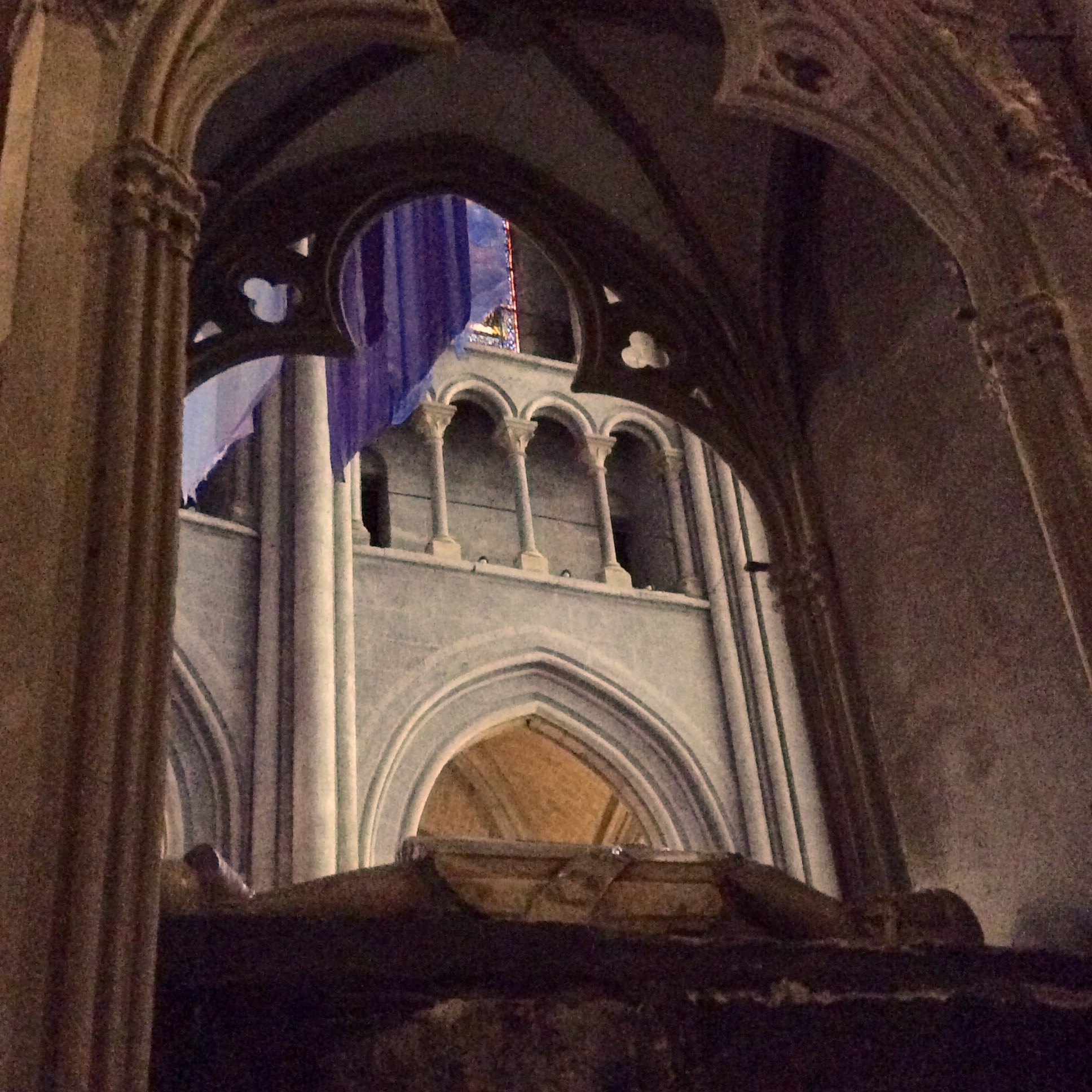
Tomb of Otto de Grandson in Lausanne Cathedral.

At the end of his life he returned to Grandson, which he had inherited from his father and to which he had made recurrent visits throughout his adult life. He never married and was succeeded by his nephew. He had advanced many of his relatives through his embassies, especially in the church. Three of his relatives served as Bishops of Lausanne and another nephew, John Grandisson, succeeded to the Diocese of Exeter. In the spring of 1328, the ninety-year-old knight set out tor one last trip to Rome. Close to Aigle, he was taken ill. On 5 April 1328, he died.

A vidimus (attested copy) of his last will and testament gave details of his funeral wishes.

"I choose burial in the cathedral church of B[lessed]. Mary [Lausanne]. Also I will and order that when my body shall be carried to the church to be laid thereupon, two men armed with my arms, and each carrying my banner with the same arms, shall precede my body on two horses, each of which shall be worth 100 livres Lausanneois, and let one of the horses be covered with my arms and the other with iron [carapace], and let the said horses be offered [with] the aforesaid arms and coverings to the aforesaid church of Lausanne, who as rightful ambassadors shall remain for the remission of my sins. . . I give and bequeath to the church of Lausanne all my ornaments, clothing and silverware which are now deposited there, with the exception of a small gold cross and a statue of the B[lessed]. Mary."

His nephew Pierre II de Grandson succeeded him as the Lord of Grandson.

== Links with the Order of the Knights Templar ==
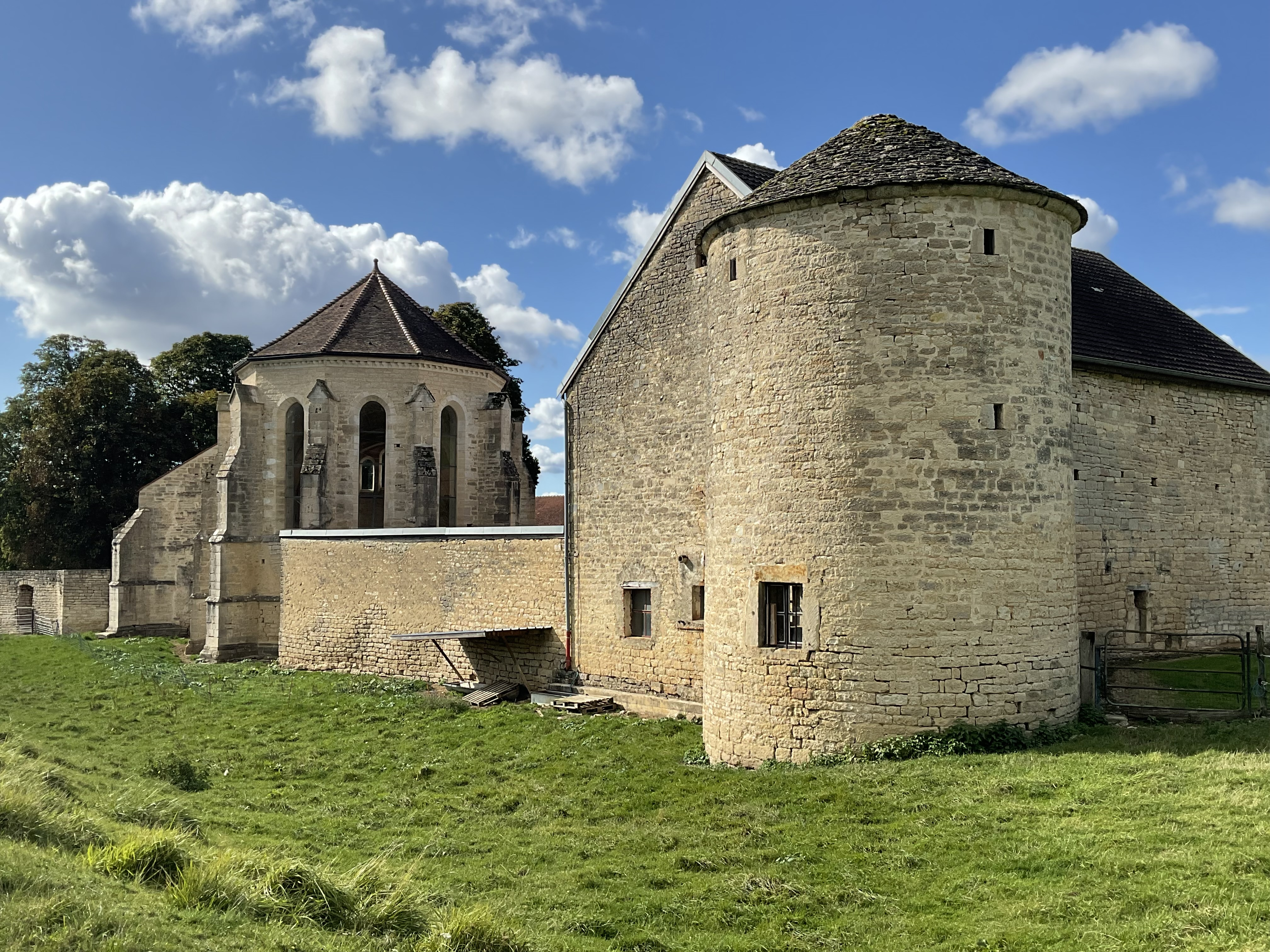
Former Templar Commanderie at Épailly in Burgundy

There is no evidence that Grandson was a member of the Templar Order, however he was a close ally of the order. At some point, the date is unclear, he was in receipt of a yearly payment from the Templars of 2,000 Livres Tournois. The payments are thought to relate to the Fall of Acre in 1291 and the subsequent election of Jacques de Molay as Grand Master of the Knights Templar on Cyprus in 1292. The payments are known, because Grandson petitioned Pope Clement V upon suppression of the order in 1308. Clement granted Grandson the revenue of three former Templar commanderies in Burgundy, including Epailly. These former Knights Templar commanderies continued to provide the enormous income formerly provided by the Templars until Grandson’s death in 1328.
