= Caernarfon town walls =

Grade I listed urban defence in Caernarfon, United Kingdom

- Caernarfon, North Wales
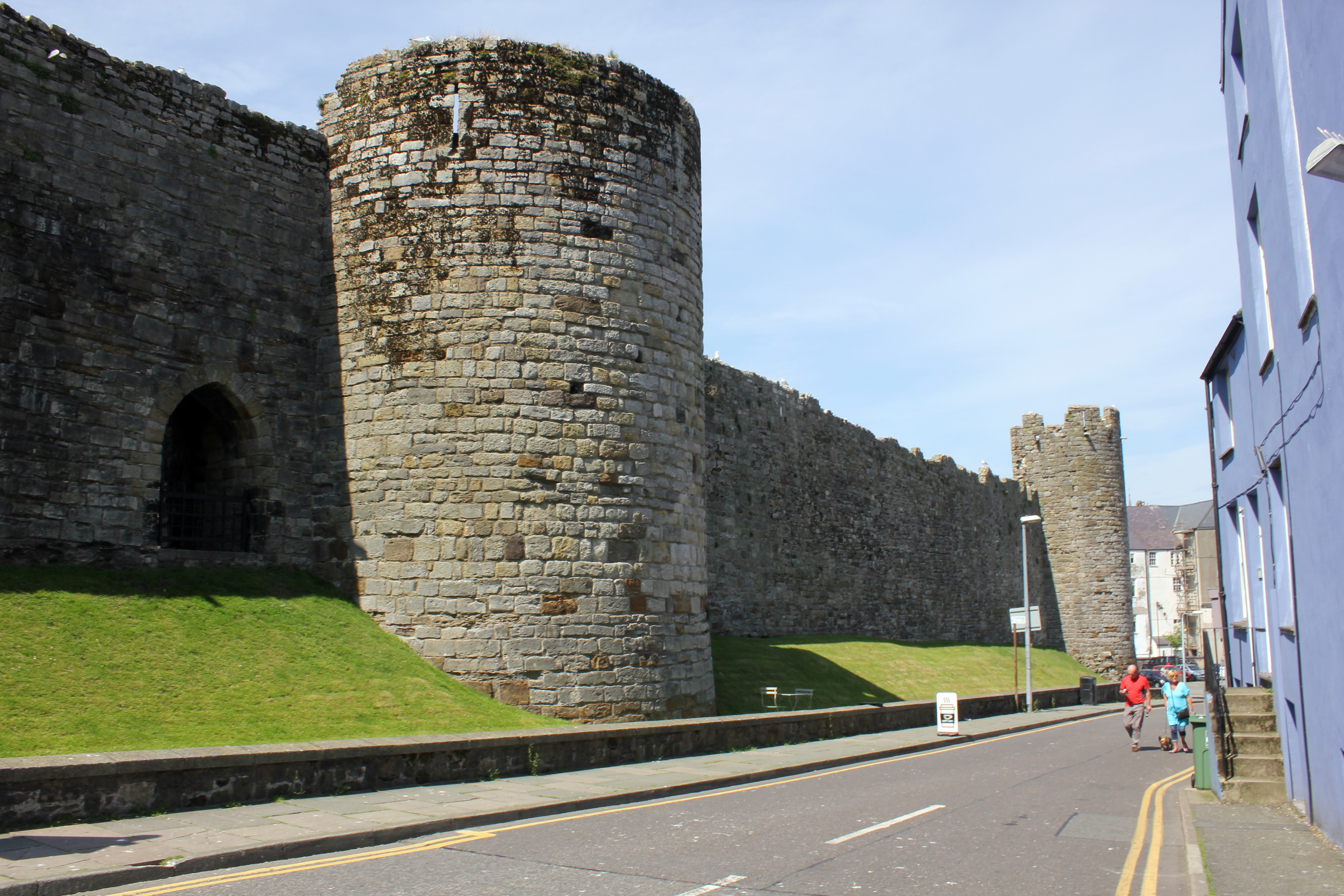
- Caernarfon town walls along Greengate Street

Site information
- Type: Town wall
- Controlled by: Cadw
- Open to the public: Yes
- Condition: Intact

Location
- Shown within Wales
- Location within Wales
- Coordinates: 53.1381°N 4.2663°W
- Grid reference: grid reference SH485625

UNESCO World Heritage Site
- Part of: Castles and Town Walls of King Edward in Gwynedd
- Criteria: Cultural: i, iii, iv
- Reference: 374
- Inscription: 1986 (10th Session)

Scheduled monument
- Official name: Caernarfon Town Wall
- Reference no.: CN034

Caernarfon's town walls are a medieval defensive structure around the town of Caernarfon in North Wales. The walls were constructed between 1283 and 1292 after the foundation of Caernarfon by Edward I, alongside the adjacent castle. The walls are 734 m (2,408 ft) long and include eight towers and two medieval gatehouses. The project was completed using large numbers of labourers brought in from England; the cost of building the walls came to around £3,500, a large sum for the period. The walls were significantly damaged during the rebellion of Madog ap Llywelyn in 1294, and had to be repaired at considerable expense. Political changes in the 16th century reduced the need to maintain such defences around the town. Today the walls form part of the UNESCO World Heritage Site administered by Cadw. Archaeologists Oliver Creighton and Robert Higham describe the defences as "a remarkably intact walled circuit".

== History ==
=== 13th century ===
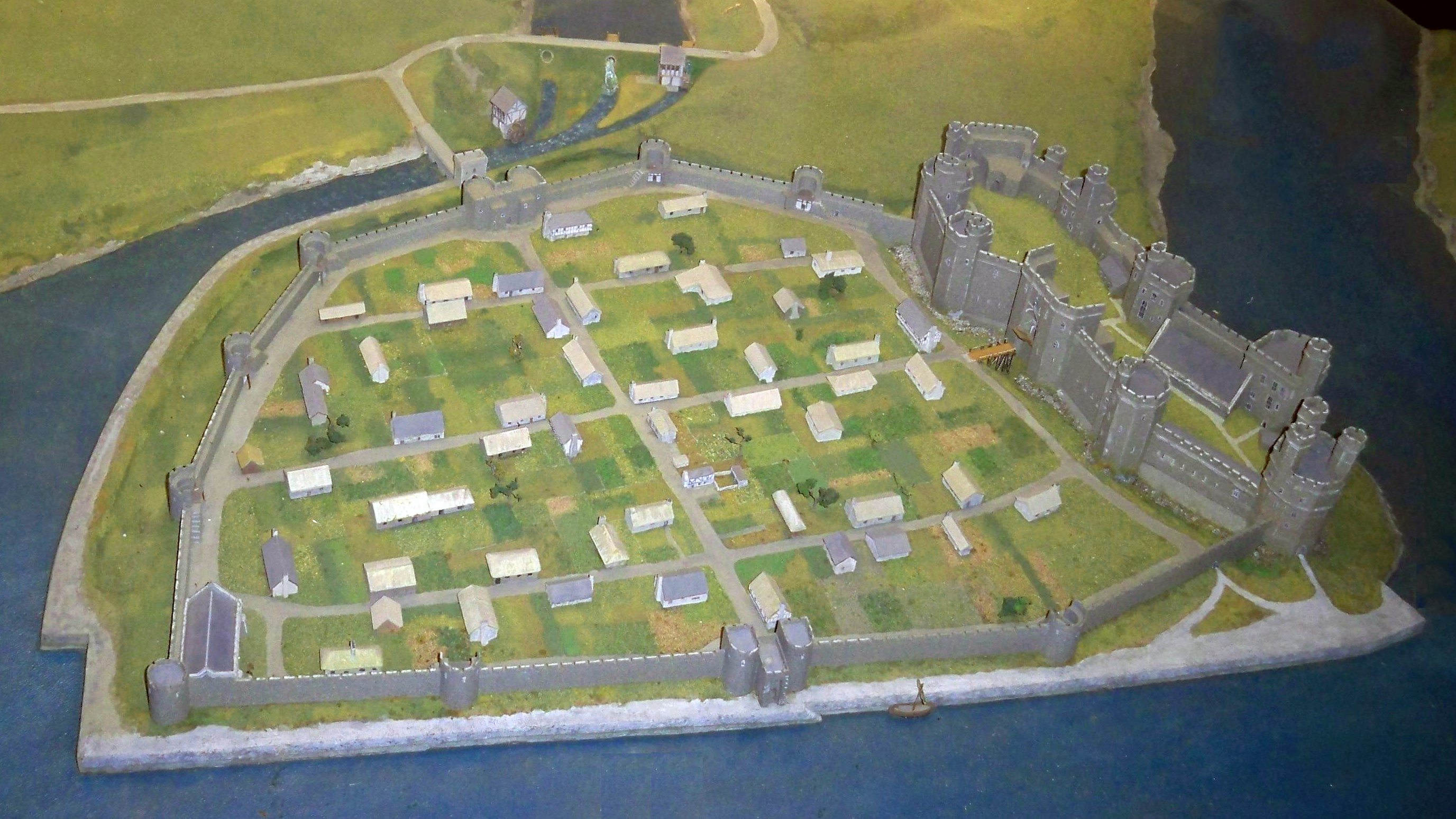
Model replica showing the town walls shortly after their completion in the 13th century, as seen from the west

Before the English construction of the town of Caernarfon, the area had been occupied first by the Romans, who built the fort of Segontium, and later by both the Normans and the Welsh princes. As a result of this long history, depicted in the Welsh saga of Mabinogion, the site was both culturally and politically significant to the medieval Welsh. The English kings and Welsh princes had vied for control of North Wales since the 1070s and the conflict had been renewed during the 13th century, leading to Edward I intervening in North Wales for the second time during his reign in 1282. Edward invaded with a huge army, pushing north from Carmarthen and westwards from Montgomery and Chester. By summer 1283 Edward had secured Caernarfon and the surrounding area.

The king decided that the location would become the centre of a new county and the capital of the principality of North Wales, with a new castle and walled town forming the administrative centre. Edward's plan was a colonial enterprise and placing the new town and walls on the Caernarfon site was in part a symbolic act to demonstrate English power; the walls also symbolised the town's status as the capital of North Wales.

Traditionally Caernarfon's design and defences have been thought to have been inspired by the growth of the bastides. The bastides were new planned towns created in both France and English-held Gascony during the period, characterised by grids of straight streets, often defended by combinations of castles and town walls. More recent research, however, has shown that English town design played a more significant role in shaping Caernarfon and other Edwardian town plans. In the case of Caernarfon, the town plan and walls were adapted to fit around the site of the former Norman castle on the site, which lay just outside the new town and was used a market place. (Note: It was unusual for towns for the period to have such an extra-mural market place—most lay inside the walls.)

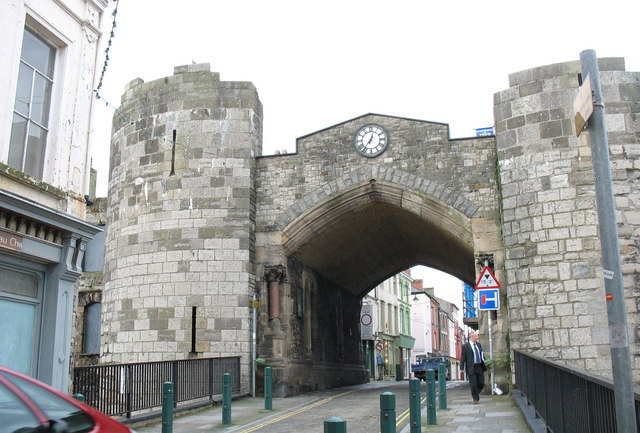
The East Gate, showing a mixture of medieval, 18th and 19th century architecture

The walls of Caernarfon were built at the same time as the castle, under the overall supervision of Master James of Saint George, Edward's chief architect in North Wales. Between 1283 and 1284, Richard the Engineer acted as James' deputy on the site; later, between 1295 and 1308, Walter of Hereford performed a similar role, and may have also been responsible for earlier work on the walls as well. Huge amounts of labourers were mobilised from across England for the task, massed at Chester and then brought into Wales for each summer building season. Work on the walls progressed quickly, albeit in uneven bursts: local houses were demolished to make way for the fortifications and the stone walls and gates were probably finished by 1292. The cost of building the town walls was around £3,500, a large sum for the period. (Note: £3,500 was almost six times the annual income of a typical 14th century English nobleman such as Richard le Scrope.)

Otto de Grandson, a favourite of Edward I, was appointed as constable of Caernarfon and justiciar of North Wales, with responsibility for security in the region. In 1294, however, Madog ap Llywelyn revolted against English rule and undertook a wide campaign across North Wales, attacking the town of Caernarfon. Despite the walls, the town was overrun, the walls badly damaged, and the castle—still largely unfinished —was easily taken and set on fire. Edward responded with military force the next year: he retook Caernarfon and ordered the town walls to be fully repaired by November 1295, at a cost of around £1,195. (Note: It is impossible to accurately compare medieval and modern prices or incomes. Historian Arnold Taylor notes that the cost—almost half the original cost of the walls—demonstrates that the Welsh damage must have been extensive.)

=== 14th to 18th centuries ===
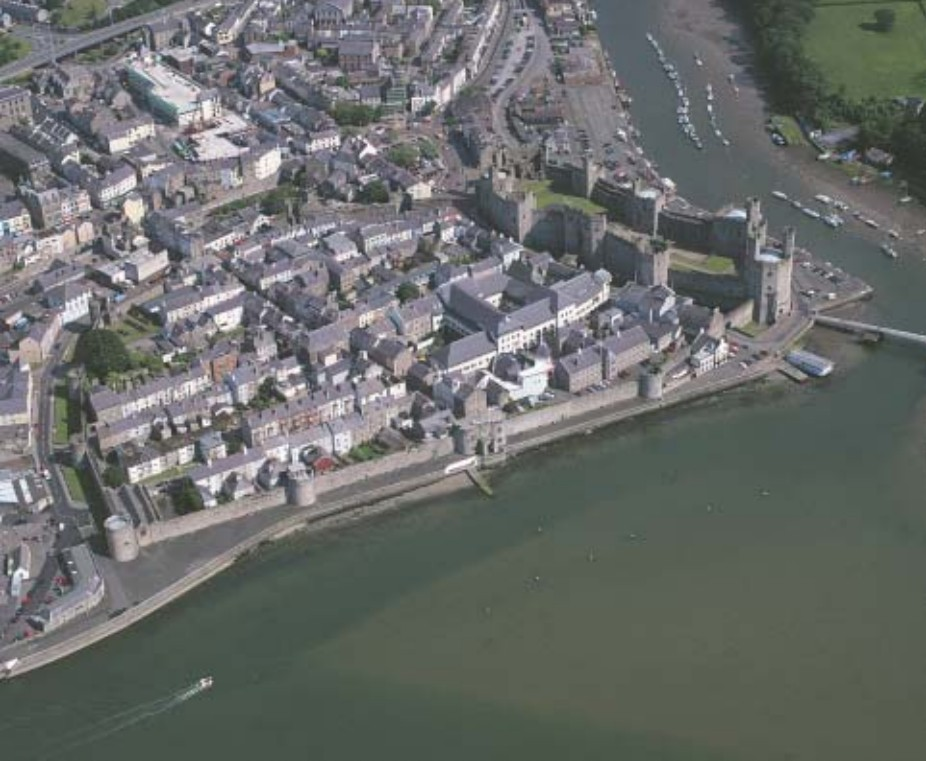
The walls and Caernarfon Castle, seen from the north-west

The new town of Caernarfon was populated by English settlers, particularly from nearby Cheshire and Lancashire, and the town walls were in part designed to encourage immigrants and royal officials to settle there in safety. The town of Caernarfon did not prove a successful settlement, however; by 1298 it had only 59 burgage tenements—properties paying rent to the king—making it far less prosperous than either neighbouring Conwy or Beaumaris, and the situation did not improve during the 14th century. In 1400 Welsh prince Owain Glyndŵr rose in rebellion against English rule, but despite attempts to take Caernarfon in 1403 and 1404, the town's defences held out. The ascension of the Tudor dynasty to the English throne resulted in a change in the way Wales was administered. The Tudors were Welsh in origin, and their rule lessened hostilities between the Welsh and English, reducing the need to maintain Caernarfon's castle and walls and easing the restrictions on Welsh access to the town—the Welsh were finally allowed to live inside Caernarfon in 1507.

Around 1800, Caernarfon's local corporation undertook a programme of modernisation work, inserting several new gateways in the town walls; other changes were also made to the walls during the period, with some towers being converted for use as administrative buildings and the gatehouses altered to accommodate more modern offices. During the 19th century the town of Caernarfon grew considerably, prompted by the slate trade and the construction of the Chester to Holyhead railway line. As a result of this population pressure, by the 20th century housing had encroached along the inside and outside of the town walls, so that in many places the walls had vanished from view. During the 20th century the walls were gradually acquired by the state and these houses demolished.

Today Caernarfon's walls are managed by the Welsh heritage organisation Cadw as a tourist attraction, although only a small part of the wall-walk is open to the public. The walls require ongoing maintenance; in the financial year between 2002 and 2003, for example, maintaining the historic fabric of the walls and the castle cost £4,500 (£5,710 in 2010 terms). (Note: The maintenance figures vary from year to year.) The walls were declared part of a UNESCO world heritage site in 1986 and hold scheduled monument status. They are considered by archaeologists Oliver Creighton and Robert Higham to be "a remarkably intact walled circuit".

== Architecture ==
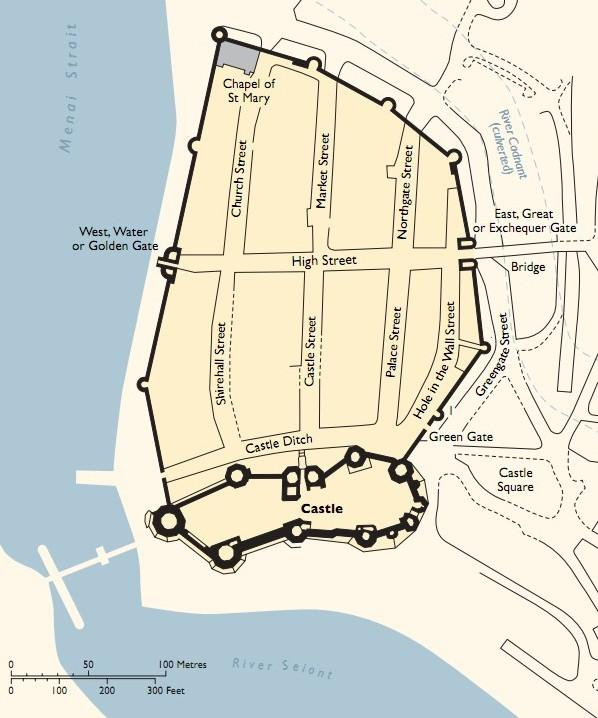
Plan of the walls in 21st century

The Caernarfon town walls today present an unbroken, 734 m (2,408 ft) long circuit around the town, enclosing 4.18 hectares (10.3 acres), and are unusually well preserved. They are mostly built from the same carboniferous limestone used at the castle. The eight towers along the wall are mostly "gap-backed", lacking walls on the inside of the towers, and originally included removable wooden bridges to allow sections of the walls to be sealed off from attackers.

The two original entrances to the town were through the West and East Gates. The West Gate faced onto the harbour, and was also known as the Golden Gate (Welsh: Porth-yr-Aur); in the medieval period, this name would have evoked images of imperial Roman and Arthurian power, as it was the name of the primary gateway in the city of Constantinople. (Note: During the period, King Arthur was believed to have Roman connections. The adjacent Caernarfon Castle may also have been designed to also resemble Constantinople.) It was originally defended by a portcullis, but was modified with additional Gothic features in the 19th century. The East Gate formed the landward entrance to the town, originally overlooking the river Cadnant—the river is now culverted over. The gatehouse contained offices for most of the period since its construction in the 13th century, first housing the royal exchequer, then Caernarfon's town hall and finally the guildhall. The offices were finally removed in the 1960s. Little of the original gatehouse remains, due to 18th and 19th century building work, although the base of the towers remains medieval. Newer entrances to the town, made by creating additional gateways in the walls, include Northgate, Greengate and the entrance to Market Street.

In the north-west corner of the walls is the 14th-century chapel of Saint Mary, built into the defences and using the only fully circular tower in the walls as a vestry. Further along the west side of the walls, several of the towers have been converted for various uses. One forms part of the County Offices, having been incorporated into the former County Gaol in the 19th century; another has been used by the Royal Welsh Yacht Club since the 19th century, and a third has been converted into a holiday home by the Landmark Trust.

== See also ==
- List of town walls in England and Wales
- Chester city walls
- Conwy town walls
- York city walls

== Bibliography ==
- Ashbee, Jeremy A. (2007) Conwy Castle. Cardiff: Cadw. ISBN 978-1-85760-259-3.
- Brown, R. Allen. (1962) English Castles. London: Batsford. OCLC 1392314.
- Creighton, Oliver Hamilton and Robert Higham. (2005) Medieval Town Walls: an Archaeology and Social History of Urban Defence. Stroud, UK: Tempus. ISBN 978-0-7524-1445-4.
- Given-Wilson, Chris. (1996) The English Nobility in the Late Middle Ages. London: Routledge. ISBN 978-0-203-44126-8.
- Lilley, Keith D. (2010) "The Landscapes of Edward's New Towns: Their Planning and Design," in Williams and Kenyon (eds) (2010).
- Lott, Graham. (2010) "The Building Stones of the Edwardian Castles," in Williams and Kenyon (eds) (2010).
- Prestwich, Michael. (2010) "Edward I and Wales," in Williams and Kenyon (eds) (2010).
- Taylor, Arnold. (2008) Caernarfon Castle and Town Walls. Cardiff: Cadw. ISBN 978-1-85760-209-8.
- Thompson, M. W. (1991) The Rise of the Castle. Cambridge: Cambridge University Press. ISBN 978-0-521-08853-4.
- Wheatley, Abigail. (2010) "Caernarfon Castle and its Mythology," in Williams and Kenyon (eds) (2010).
- Williams, Diane M. and John R. Kenyon. (eds) (2010) The Impact of the Edwardian Castles in Wales. Oxford: Oxbow Books. ISBN 978-1-84217-380-0.
