= Conwy town walls =

Grade I listed building in Conwy, Wales

- Conwy, Wales
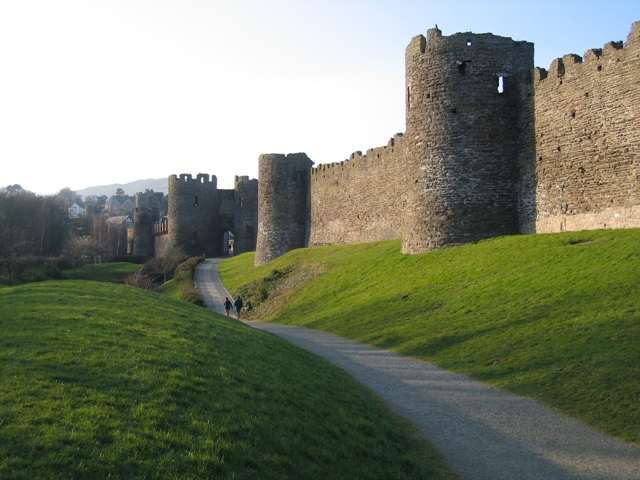
- The south side of the walls, looking towards Mill Gate

Site information
- Type: Town wall
- Owner: Cadw
- Open to the public: Yes
- Condition: Intact

Location
- Shown within Wales
- Location within Wales
- Coordinates: 53.2803°N 3.8388°W
- Grid reference: grid reference SH775775

Site history
- Materials: Sandstone, limestone and rhyolite

UNESCO World Heritage Site
- Part of: Castles and Town Walls of King Edward in Gwynedd
- Criteria: Cultural: i, iii, iv
- Reference: 374
- Inscription: 1986 (10th Session)

Listed Building – Grade I
- Designated: 1950

The Conwy town walls are a medieval defensive structure around the town of Conwy in Wales. The walls were constructed between 1283 and 1287 after the foundation of Conwy by Edward I, and were designed to form an integrated system of defence alongside Conwy Castle. The walls are 1.3 km (0.81 mi) long and include 21 towers and three gatehouses. The project was completed using large quantities of labourers brought in from England; the cost of building the castle and walls together came to around £15,000, a huge sum for the period. The walls were slightly damaged during the rebellion of Owain Glyndŵr in 1401, but political changes in the 16th century reduced the need to maintain such defences around the town. The fortifications were treated sympathetically during the development of the road and railway systems in Conwy during the 19th century and survived largely intact into the modern period. Today the walls form part of the UNESCO World Heritage Site administered by Cadw. Historians Oliver Creighton and Robert Higham describe the defences as "one of the most impressive walled circuits" in Europe.

== History ==
=== 13th century ===
Before the English construction of the town of Conwy, the site was occupied by Aberconwy Abbey, a Cistercian monastery favoured by the Welsh princes. The site also controlled an important crossing point over the river Conwy between the coastal and inland areas of North Wales, and was defended for many years by Deganwy Castle. The English kings and Welsh princes had vied for control of the region since the 1070s and the conflict had been renewed during the 13th century, leading to Edward I intervening in North Wales for the second time during his reign in 1282. Edward invaded with a huge army, pushing north from Carmarthen and westwards from Montgomery and Chester. Edward captured Aberconwy in March 1283 and decided that the location would form the centre of a new county: the abbey would be relocated eight miles inland and a new English castle and walled town would be built on the monastery's former site. The ruined castle of Deganwy was abandoned and never rebuilt. Edward's plan was a colonial enterprise and placing the new town and walls on top of such a high-status native Welsh site was in part a symbolic act to demonstrate English power.

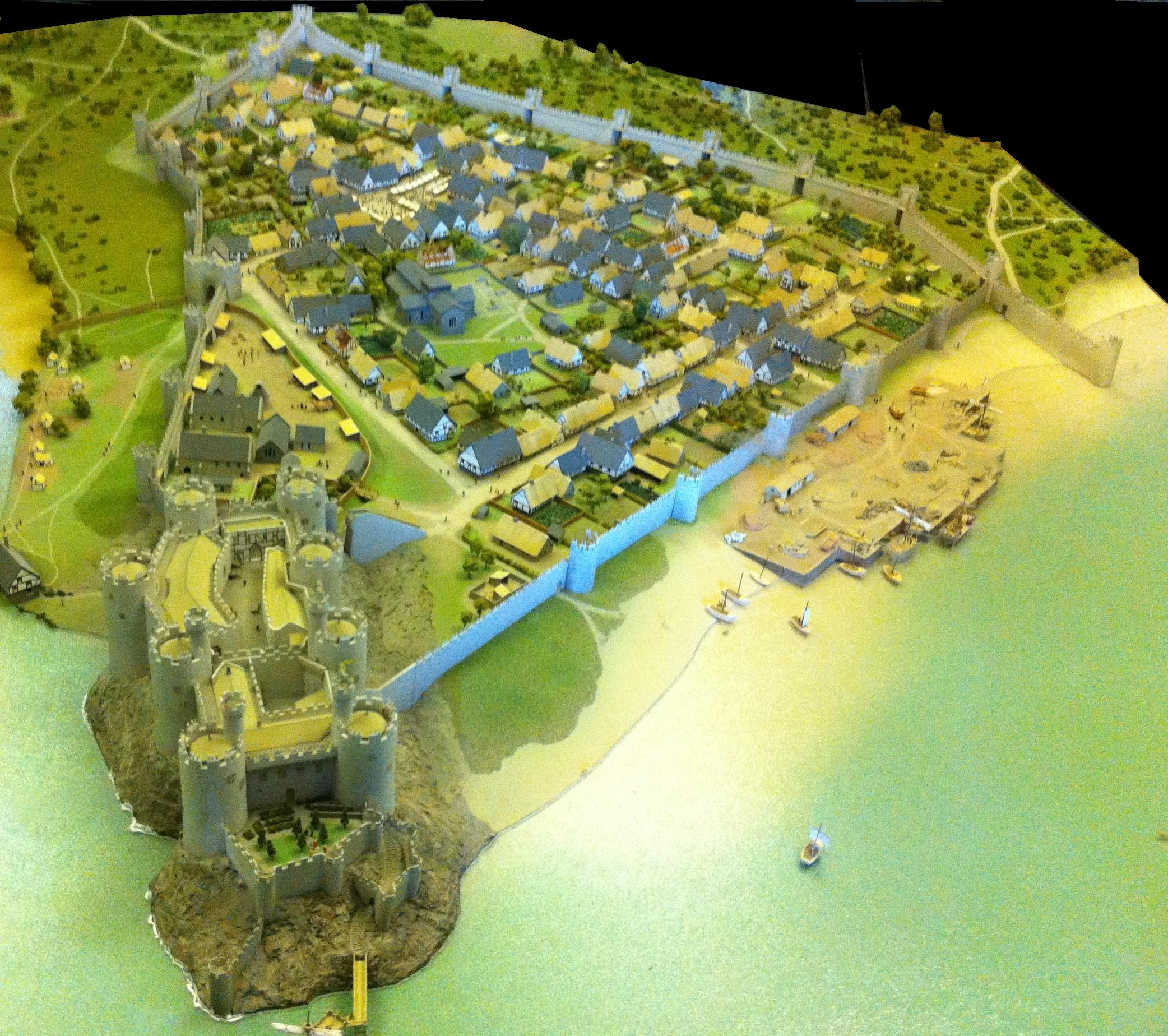
Reconstruction of the town walls shortly after their completion in the 13th century, seen from the east

Traditionally Conwy's design and defences have been thought to have been inspired by the growth of the bastides. The bastides were new planned towns created in both France and English-held Gascony during the period, characterised by grids of straight streets, often defended by combinations of castles and town walls. More recent research, however, has shown that English town design played a more significant role in shaping Conwy and other Edwardian town plans. Analysis of the new towns in Wales and England of the period has identified common similarities in their design, with most featuring a T-shaped street plan stretching away from the coast or river, aligned with a castle that is usually positioned at a top corner of the "T". The street plan of Conwy forms a mirror image of Beaumaris, for example, although ditches and palisades protected Beaumaris rather than a stone wall.

The walls of Conwy were built at around the same time as the castle itself, under the overall supervision of Master James of Saint George, Edward's chief architect in North Wales. Each summer huge numbers of labourers were mobilised from across England, massed at Chester, and then brought into Wales for the building season. The first phase of work on the walls in 1283 involved digging ditches and erecting a palisade around the future town to secure the area in order to allow further work to commence. The stone walls and towers were then constructed in three phases. Between 1284 and 1285, Richard the Engineer, Master James' second in command in North Wales, built the western side of the walls; this was the most vulnerable side of the town and was deliberately given priority. In 1286, John Francis, a Savoyard mason, finished the south wall and in 1287 the remainder of the walls along the eastern quayside were completed under the supervision of Philip of Darley. Edward's accountants did not separate the costs of the town walls from that of the castle, and the total cost of the two projects came to around £15,000, a huge sum for the period. (Note: It is impossible to accurately compare medieval and modern prices or incomes. For comparison, £15,000 is around twenty-five times the annual income of a 14th-century nobleman such as Richard le Scrope.)

=== 14th to 18th centuries ===
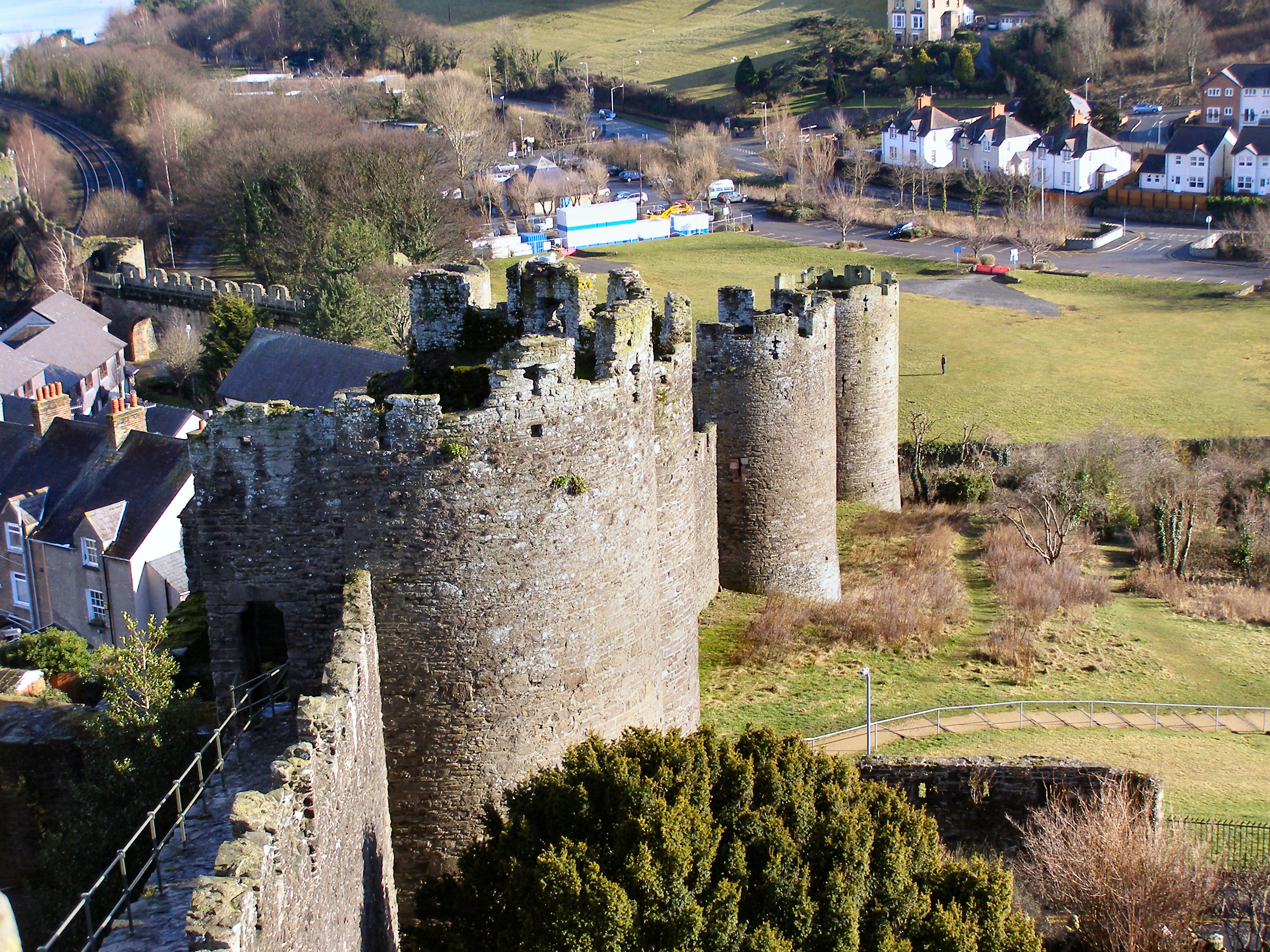
Western stretch of the walls, showing an area on the right cleared of housing after 1953

The new town of Conwy was populated by English settlers, particularly from nearby Cheshire and Lancashire, and the town walls were in part designed to encourage immigrants to settle there in safety. The town of Conwy was only modestly successful, however, since by 1312, it had 124 burgage tenements, properties paying rent to the king, which made it more successful than neighbouring Caernarfon but less so than Beaumaris. Welsh residents appear to have slowly arrived inside the town during the 14th century and even then were subject to considerable suspicion. Protecting the town remained a priority and during this period the constable charged with the security of the castle was also the mayor of Conwy, although protecting the town walls was probably the duty of the citizens rather than the forces attached to the castle. The walls were guarded by crossbowmen, and improved firing positions for them were built into the town walls at the start of the 14th century.

In 1400, the Welsh prince Owain Glyndŵr rose in rebellion against English rule. Two of Owain's cousins infiltrated and took control of Conwy Castle in 1401 and, despite the defensive walls, the town of Conwy was occupied for two months and sacked by Welsh forces. The townspeople complained that £5,000 worth of damage had been done, including the destruction of the gates and the bridges along the town walls. (Note: It is impossible to accurately compare 13th-century and modern prices or incomes; the £5,000 quoted by the townspeople, a third of the cost of the entire construction costs for the castle and walls, may have been an exaggeration.)

Over a century later, there are records of the walls being repaired in the 1520s and 1530s by Henry VIII in preparation for a potential royal visit, but the ascension of the Tudor dynasty to the English throne had heralded a change in the way Wales was administered. The Tudors were Welsh in origin, and their rule eased hostilities between the Welsh and English. The military importance of Conwy's defences declined and the townspeople used the walls' defensive ditches for discarding rubbish. Parts of the town walls were robbed for their stone during this period for use in the construction of local buildings.

=== 19th to 21st centuries ===
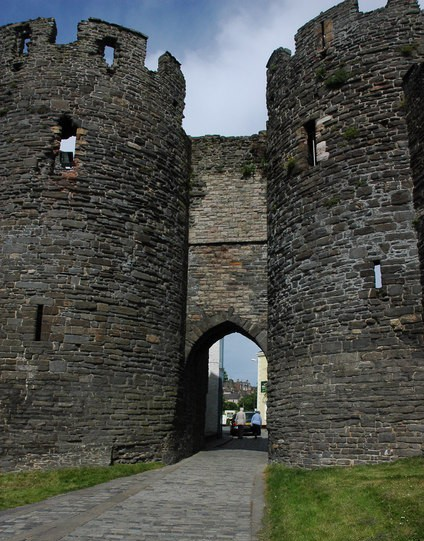
The Mill Gate gatehouse, showing a rectangular recess for a drawbridge

During the 19th century some changes to Conwy's town walls were made in order to accommodate a new railway line and roads. The engineer Thomas Telford built two new gateways into the walls in 1826 to accommodate the traffic from the new suspension bridge across the river Conwy. In 1848 Robert Stephenson constructed the Chester to Holyhead railway line, which ran through Conwy; unusually for the period, attempts were made to sensitively protect the appearance of the medieval fortifications and the entrance for the railway through the walls on the south side of the town was built in the form of a mock-Gothic archway, while an exit tunnel was dug under the western walls.

Interest in the town walls grew and in the 19th century one of the towers was restored and part of the wall-walk opened up for tourists. The walls were architecturally surveyed for the first time between 1928 and 1930, with the results published in 1938. The town walls were leased from Conwy's local authority by the Ministry of Works in 1953, and a concerted effort began to conserve and protect the fortifications. Many of the houses and buildings that had grown up against the walls since the 14th century were removed in an effort to improve the appearance of the walled circuit and to assist in conservation and archaeological work, and one of the 19th-century gateways inserted by Telford was demolished in 1958. Arnold J. Taylor, a prominent historian of the Edwardian castles, conducted extensive academic work on the history and architecture of Conwy's walls during the 1950s and 1960s, adding to their prominence.

Today Conwy's walls are managed by the Welsh heritage organisation Cadw as a tourist attraction; they form a popular walk around the town, although not all of the walls are safe for tourists to use. The walls require ongoing maintenance; in the financial year between 2002 and 2003, for example, this cost £145,000 (£184,000 in 2010 terms). The walls were declared part of a UNESCO world heritage site in 1986 and are classed as a Grade I listed building and hold scheduled monument status. They are considered by historians Oliver Creighton and Robert Higham to be "one of the most impressive walled circuits" in Europe.

== Architecture ==
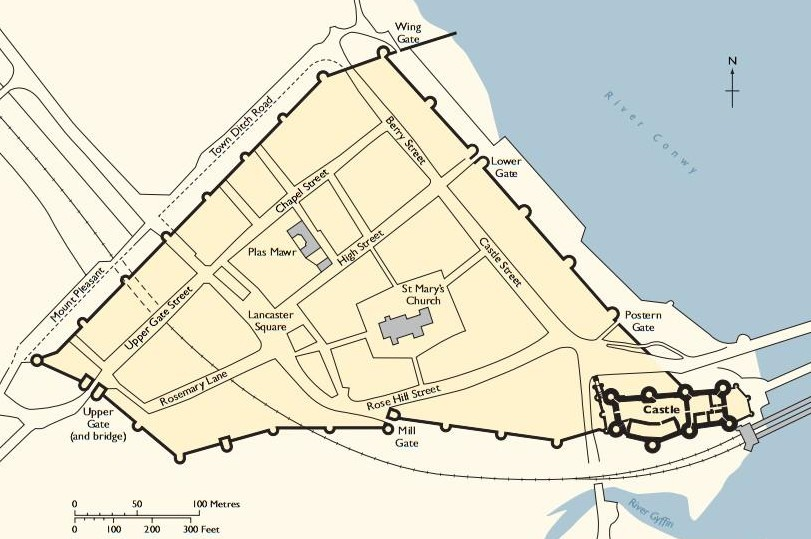
Plan of the walls in 21st century

The Conwy town walls today present a largely unbroken, 1.3 km (0.81 mi) long triangular circuit around the town, enclosing 10 hectares (25 acres) and, thanks in part to Conwy remaining a relatively small town, are unusually well preserved. They are mostly built from the same local sandstone and limestone used at the castle, but with additional rhyolite stone used along the upper parts of the eastern walls. When first built, the historical record shows that the walls were "daubed". It is unclear precisely what this involved, but it implies the walls were not simply bare stone and possibly were whitewashed. The 21 surviving towers are mostly "gap-backed", lacking walls on the inside of the towers, and originally included removable wooden bridges to allow sections of the walls to be sealed off from attackers. The tops of the walls feature an unusual design that uses a sequence of corbels to provide a flat, relatively wide wall-walk.

The east side of the walls emerge from Conwy Castle but are gapped where the Chester to Holyhead road enters the town. The east side has four towers, with a postern gate and the Lower Gate both giving access to the town's quay; all of these features have been substantially altered from their original medieval appearances. The Lower Gate, equipped with twin towers and a portcullis, controlled access to both the quayside and, before the construction of the bridge, the ferry across the estuary. The wall here was originally only 3.6 m (12 ft) high in places, and was later raised to its current height using rhyolite stone in the early 14th century.

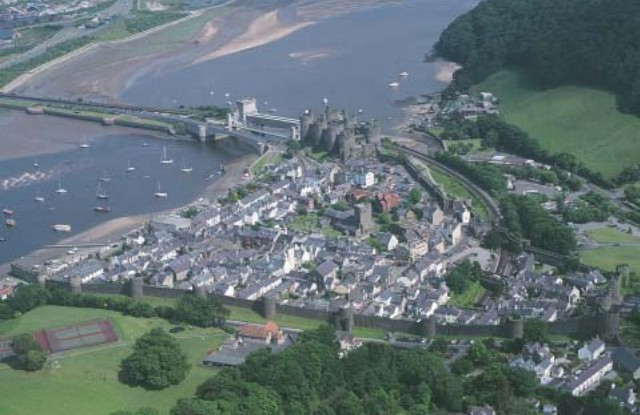
The walls and Conwy Castle, seen from the north-west

The west side of the walls include nine towers, rising upwards towards the south-west corner. Two of the towers were significantly affected by 19th-century developments; one was converted into an entrance way for the Bangor Road in 1827, whilst another suffered a deep fissure caused by subsidence from the excavation of the Chester to Holyhead railway tunnel in 1845, and had to be underpinned in 1963. One of the remaining merlons on this stretch of the walls' battlements has a stone finial on top, a design originally used along all of the town walls. The western wall originally extended out to the river Conwy itself, ending in a round tower, but this has since been lost; a similar spur arrangement was seen at Chester and Lincoln.

The walls stretch along the south of the town with eight towers and two gatehouses. The Upper Gate formed the main inland entrance to the town during the medieval period, and, in addition to its twin towers, was originally protected by a stone barbican, of which some stonework still remains, a rare survival for town barbicans of this period. A gatekeeper would have lived over the entrance during the medieval period. The original defensive ditch and drawbridge have been filled in, however, and replaced by a modern road. The second gatehouse, Mill Gate, was designed to allow access to the royal watermill that lay just outside the main town, and similarly features twin protective towers. In between the two gatehouses are the remains of Llywelyn's Hall, a grand building originally built into the town walls by Edward I before being dismantled and moved to Caernarfon Castle in 1316. Further along the walls is the mock-Gothic archway built in 1846 to accommodate the local railway, possibly drawing on similar designs used in Chester. A unique set of twelve medieval latrines is built into the southern town walls, first constructed for the use of royal staff working in adjacent buildings in the 13th century.

== See also ==
- List of town walls in England and Wales

== Bibliography ==
- Ashbee, Jeremy A. (2007) Conwy Castle. Cardiff: Cadw. ISBN 978-1-85760-259-3.
- Brown, R. Allen. (1962) English Castles. London: Batsford. OCLC 1392314.
- Creighton, Oliver Hamilton and Robert Higham. (2005) Medieval Town Walls: an Archaeology and Social History of Urban Defence. Stroud, UK: Tempus. ISBN 978-0-7524-1445-4.
- Given-Wilson, Chris. (1996) The English Nobility in the Late Middle Ages. London: Routledge. ISBN 978-0-203-44126-8.
- Hull, Lise E. and Whitehorne, Stephen. (2008) Great Castles of Britain & Ireland. London: New Holland Publishers. ISBN 978-1-84773-130-2.
- Kenyon, John R. (2010) "Arnold Taylor's Contribution to the Study of the Edwardian Castles in Wales," in Williams and Kenyon (eds) (2010).
- Lilley, Keith D. (2010) "The Landscapes of Edward's New Towns: Their Planning and Design," in Williams and Kenyon (eds) (2010).
- Longley, David. (2010) "Gwynedd Before and After the Conquest," in Williams and Kenyon (eds) (2010).
- Lott, Graham. (2010) "The Building Stones of the Edwardian Castles," in Williams and Kenyon (eds) (2010).
- Pounds, Norman John Greville. (1994) The Medieval Castle in England and Wales: a Social and Political History. Cambridge: Cambridge University Press. ISBN 978-0-521-45828-3.
- Prestwich, Michael. (2010) "Edward I and Wales," in Williams and Kenyon (eds) (2010).
- Taylor, Arnold. (2008) Caernarfon Castle and Town Walls. Cardiff: Cadw. ISBN 978-1-85760-209-8.
- Williams, Diane M. and John R. Kenyon. (eds) (2010) The Impact of the Edwardian Castles in Wales. Oxford: Oxbow Books. ISBN 978-1-84217-380-0.
