= James of Saint George =

13th-century European architect

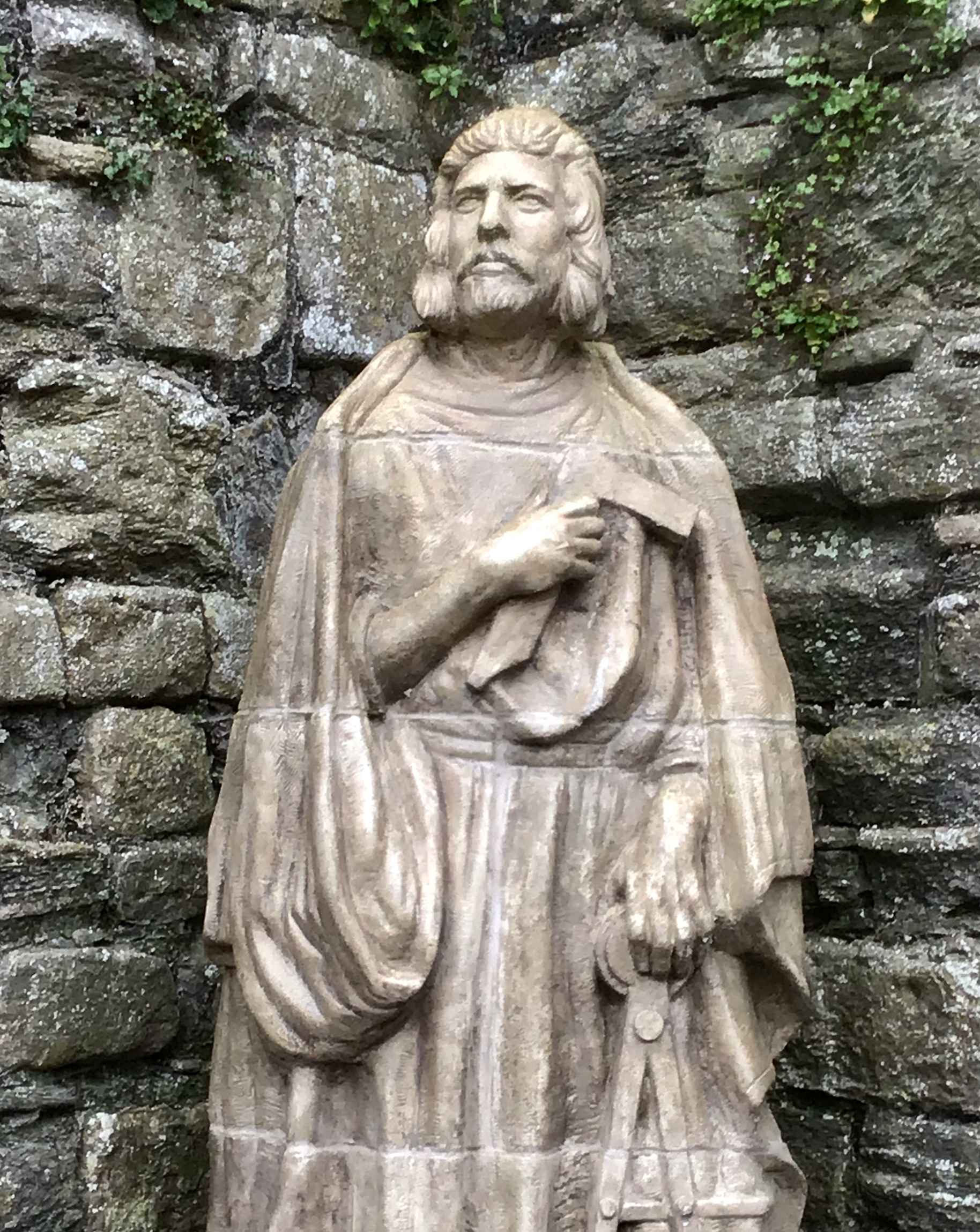
Master James statue at Beaumaris Castle

Master James of Saint George (c. 1230–1309; French: Maître Jacques de Saint-Georges, Old French: Mestre Jaks, Latin: Magister Jacobus de Sancto Georgio) was a master of works/architect from Savoy, described by historian Marc Morris as "one of the greatest architects of the European Middle Ages". He was largely responsible for designing King Edward I's castles in North Wales, including Conwy, Harlech and Caernarfon (all begun in 1283) and Beaumaris on Anglesey (begun 1295).

== Origin and early life ==
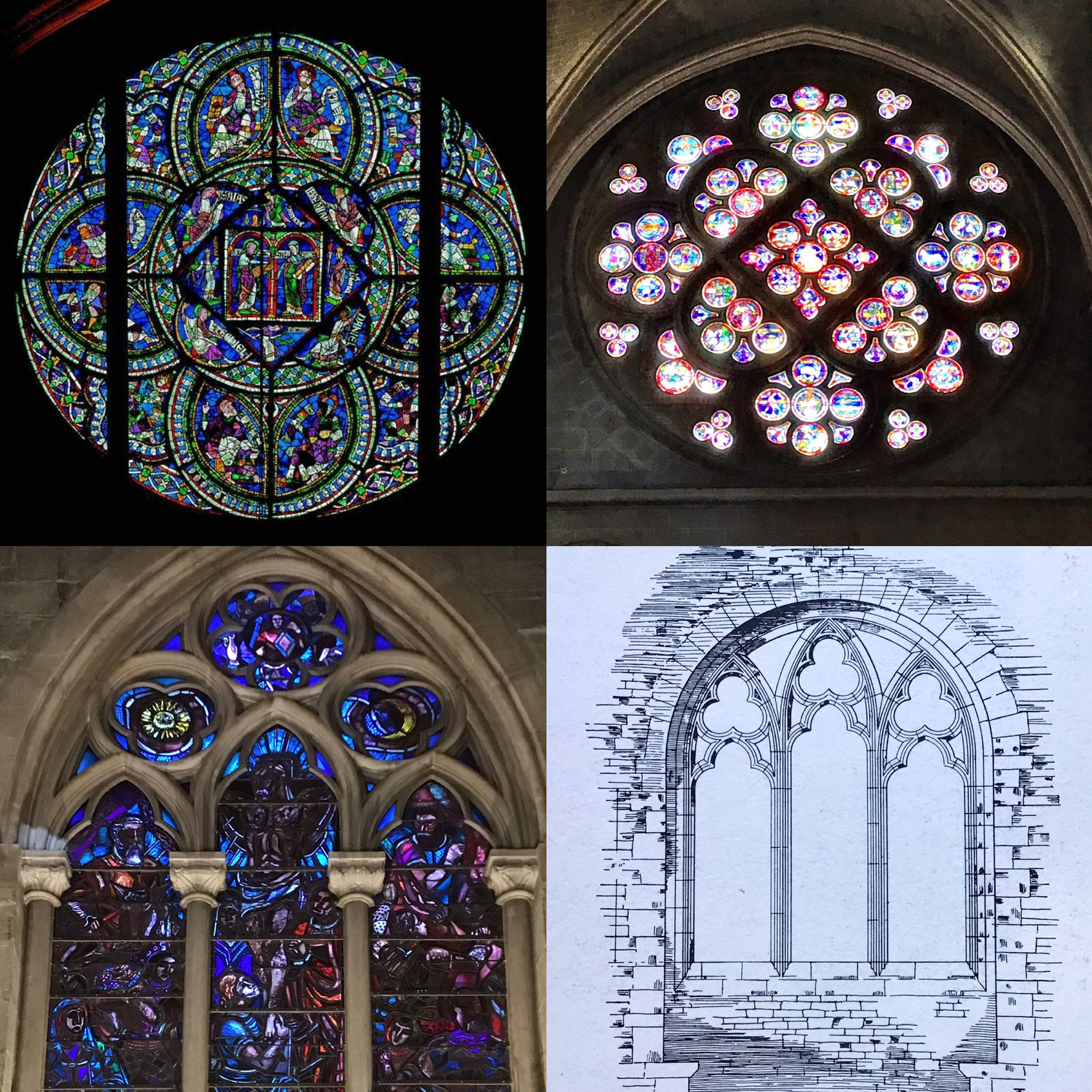
A comparison of the rose window of Canterbury Cathedral (top left) with the rose window of Lausanne Cathedral (top right) and the west window of Lausanne Cathedral (bottom left) with the eastern hall window of Conwy Castle (bottom right)

There is little firm documentary evidence of James' early life and origin. Circumstantial evidence, however, suggests that his place of birth was Saint-Prex in or around the year 1230. His father was also an architect mason, named John. This strong evidence related to his father, including year of death and architectural style, lead to the conclusion that John was Jean Cotereel, the builder of Saint-Prex and Lausanne Cathedral. Of particular interest are the similarities of the rose windows at Canterbury Cathedral and Lausanne Cathedral and the similarity of the west window of Lausanne Cathedral to that of the eastern hall window later built at Conwy Castle.

He would, having moved to England, become known as Master James of Saint George referencing his last known workplace and home in the Viennois Saint-Georges-d'Espéranche. The name not coming from the Saint George patron saint of England but from a sainted Archbishop of Vienne.

== Alpine works ==
The career of "Magistro Jacobo" began with the construction for Peter II, Count of Savoy of Yverdon-les-Bains Castle. At Yverdon, James was at first working with his father John, but by 1265 he is recorded as working alone, likely indicating the death of his father. From his apprenticeship to his father he went on to work under the guidance of an engineer from Gascony, who had previously worked for Henry III of England, Jean de Mézos. James worked at the Château de Melphe at Salins-les-Thermes at works dictated by Mézos in 1267–68.

Following the death of Peter II, Count of Savoy in 1268 he went on to work for his successor, Philip I, Count of Savoy. Unlike Peter, who had preferred Chillon Castle as his main residence, Philip preferred the Viennois which was closer to his former see of Lyon. Philip began construction of a new palace castle at Saint-Georges-d'Espéranche. Building the castle would be Magistro Jacobo; his name "Saint George", only acquired after moving to England, may well be a reference to this castle of Saint-Georges-d'Espéranche and/or his prior residence at the village of the same name. The first reference to this name in English records is Magistri Jacobi Di Sancto Georgio on 8 November 1280, two years after his arrival into England. His patron, King Edward I, probably met Master James of St George whilst returning from Crusade and visiting Savoy in 1273. It was 25 June 1273 that King Edward I of England visited Saint-Georges-d'Espéranche so that his great-uncle Philip I, Count of Savoy might pay homage to him in fulfilment of an earlier 1246 treaty whereby the castles of Bard, Avigliana, the palace of Susa and town of Saint-Maurice had been enfeoffed to the King of England.

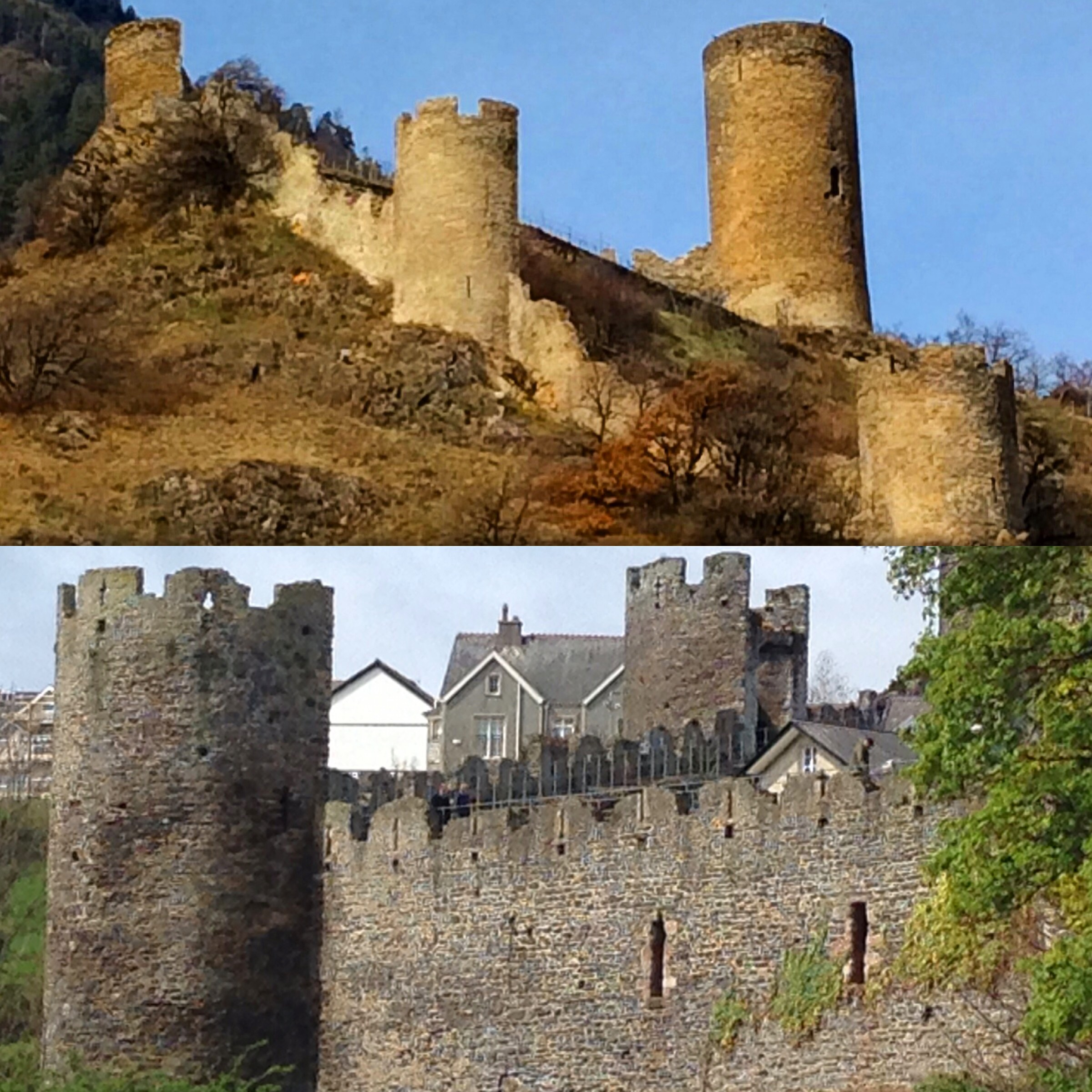
Comparison of Saillon and Conwy town walls

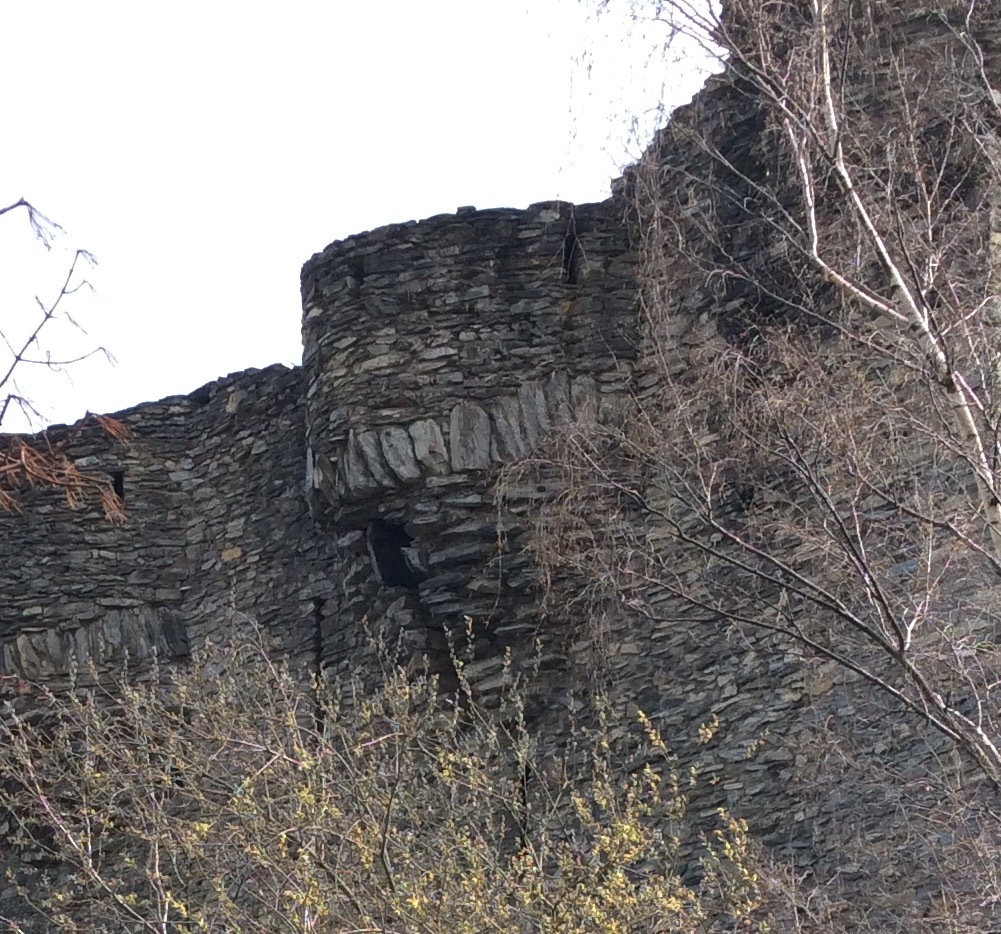
Castle toilets at La Bâtiaz

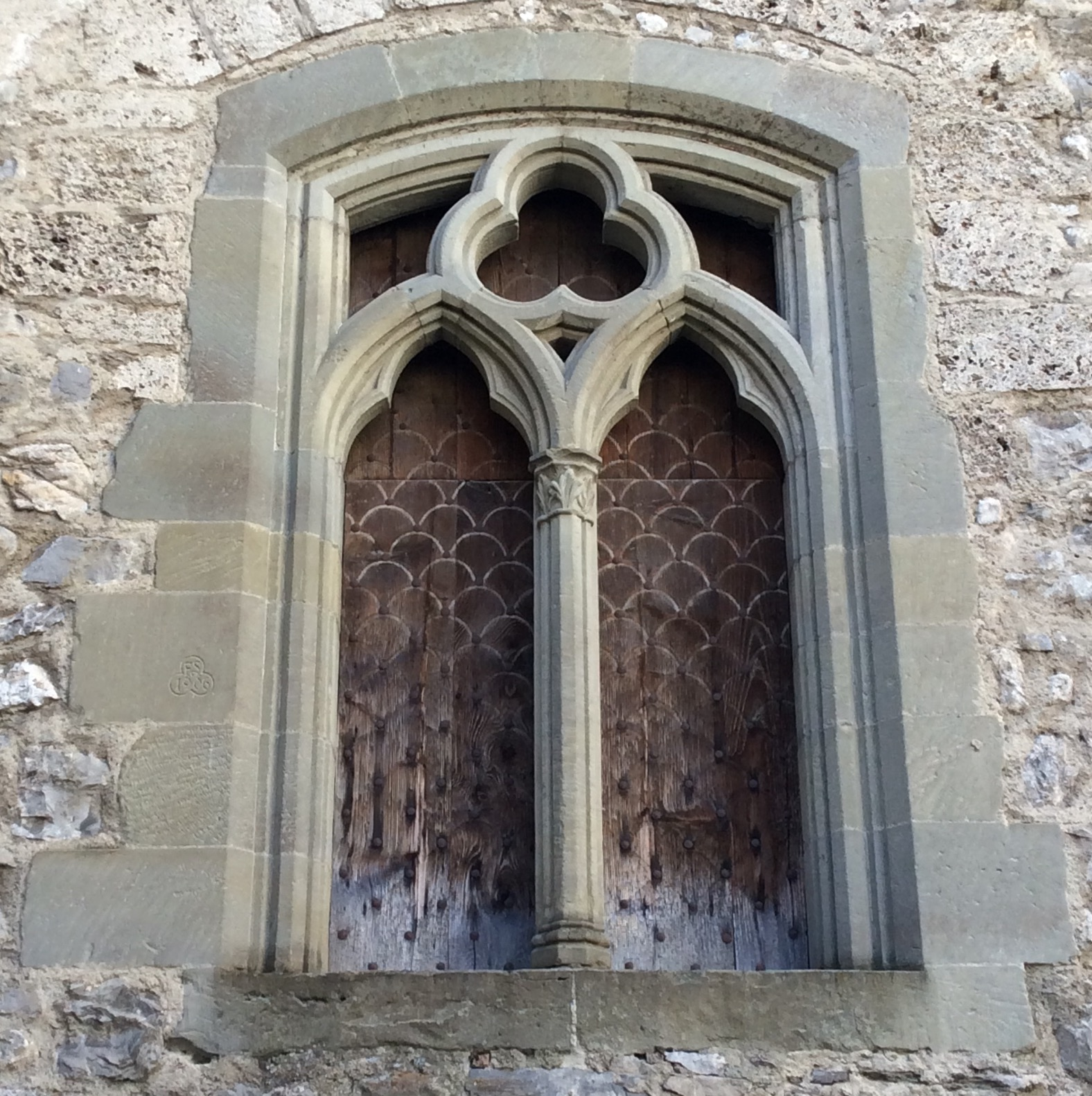
Chillon Castle windows dimensionally match those at Harlech Castle

James was responsible for the castles constructed for Philip I, Count of Savoy in the Viennois between 1270 and 1275 at Saint-Georges-d'Espéranche, La Côte-Saint-André, Voiron and Saint-Laurent-du-Pont. It is very possible that the simultaneous construction of these castles, three round tower castles and one octagonal tower palace castle, influenced Edward's decision to hire him to construct the castles in north Wales. Perhaps his last work in Savoy was at Châtel-Argent in the Aosta Valley in the summer of 1275.

There is an archival gap of the career of Magistro Jacobo between 1275 when he is last recorded in Savoy and 1278 when first recorded in Britain. Marshall has suggested that during the 'gap' he may have been working for the family of Otto de Grandson who was close to both Edward I of England and the comital family of Savoy, possibly including the construction of Grandson Castle and Lucens Castle.

Historian and author A. J. Taylor proposed in 1950 that Jacques de Saint-Georges and Master James of Saint George were one and the same man. Taylor travelled from Wales to Savoy, noting the similarities of their castles' architectural features, citing the garderobes at La Bâtiaz Castle, the windows at Chillon Castle along with the town walls at Saillon as examples.

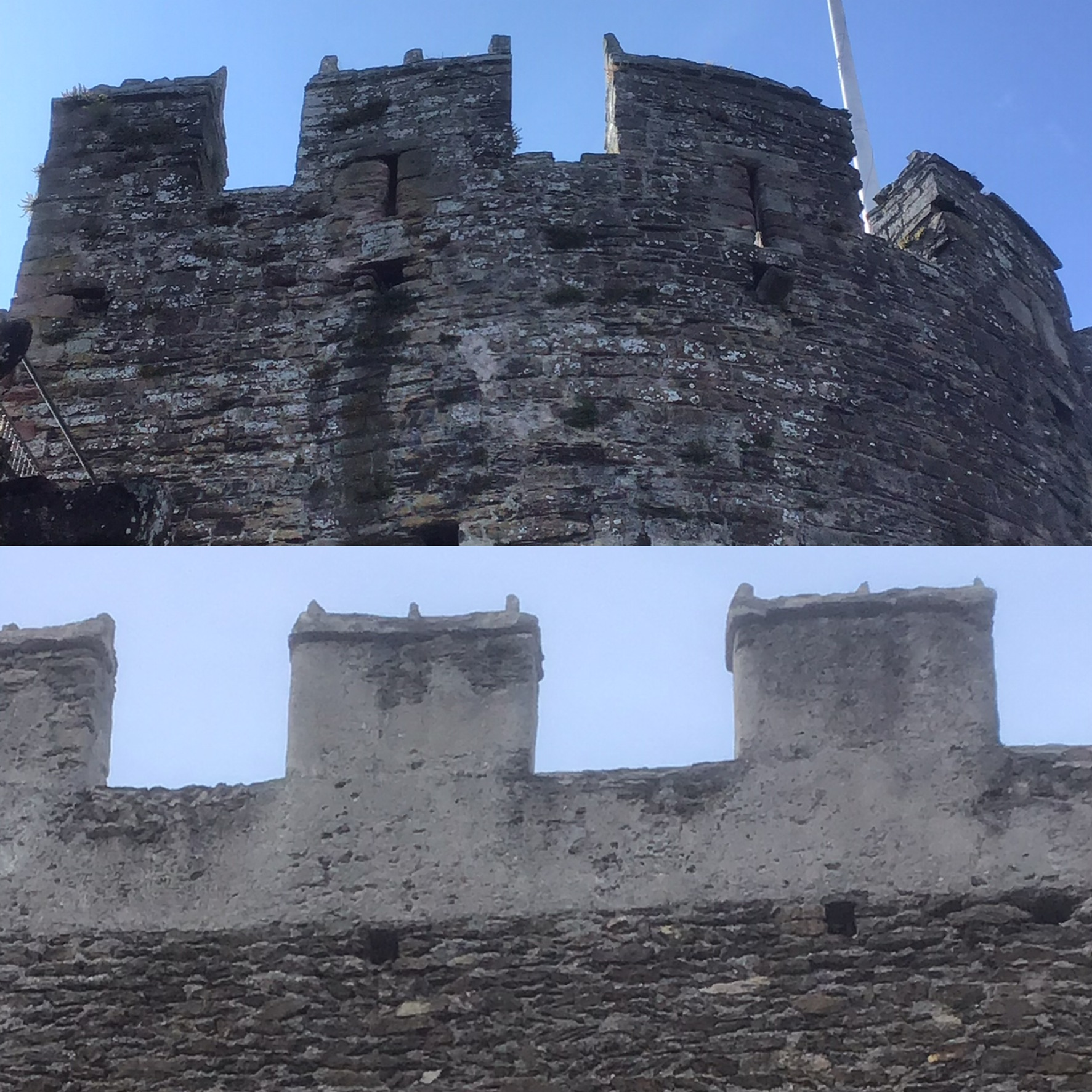
Comparison of three pinnacled merlons, upper at Conwy and lower at the Castello di San Giorio di Susa

== British works ==
Following the short war of 1277 between Edward I of England and Llywelyn ap Gruffudd, following the latter's refusal to pay due homage, James was called from Savoy to England to the service of the king. The earliest references in the English records of James of St George are found in April 1278 describing him as "eunti in partibus Wallie ad ordinandum opera castrorum" translates as "going to Wales to put in order the works of the castles" there, that is the Mason charged with the design, technical direction and management of the works underway in Wales He is recorded as travelling to Wales, "visitandum castra de Flint et Rothelan" at which time four new castles were being built: Flint, Rhuddlan, Builth and Aberystwyth. Historian A. J. Taylor records that from 1277 until 1280 his main work was to supervise the building of Rhuddlan Castle and the canalisation of the River Clwyd before turning to Flint. Flint Castle is similar in concept to that built by Master James earlier at Yverdon-les-Bains

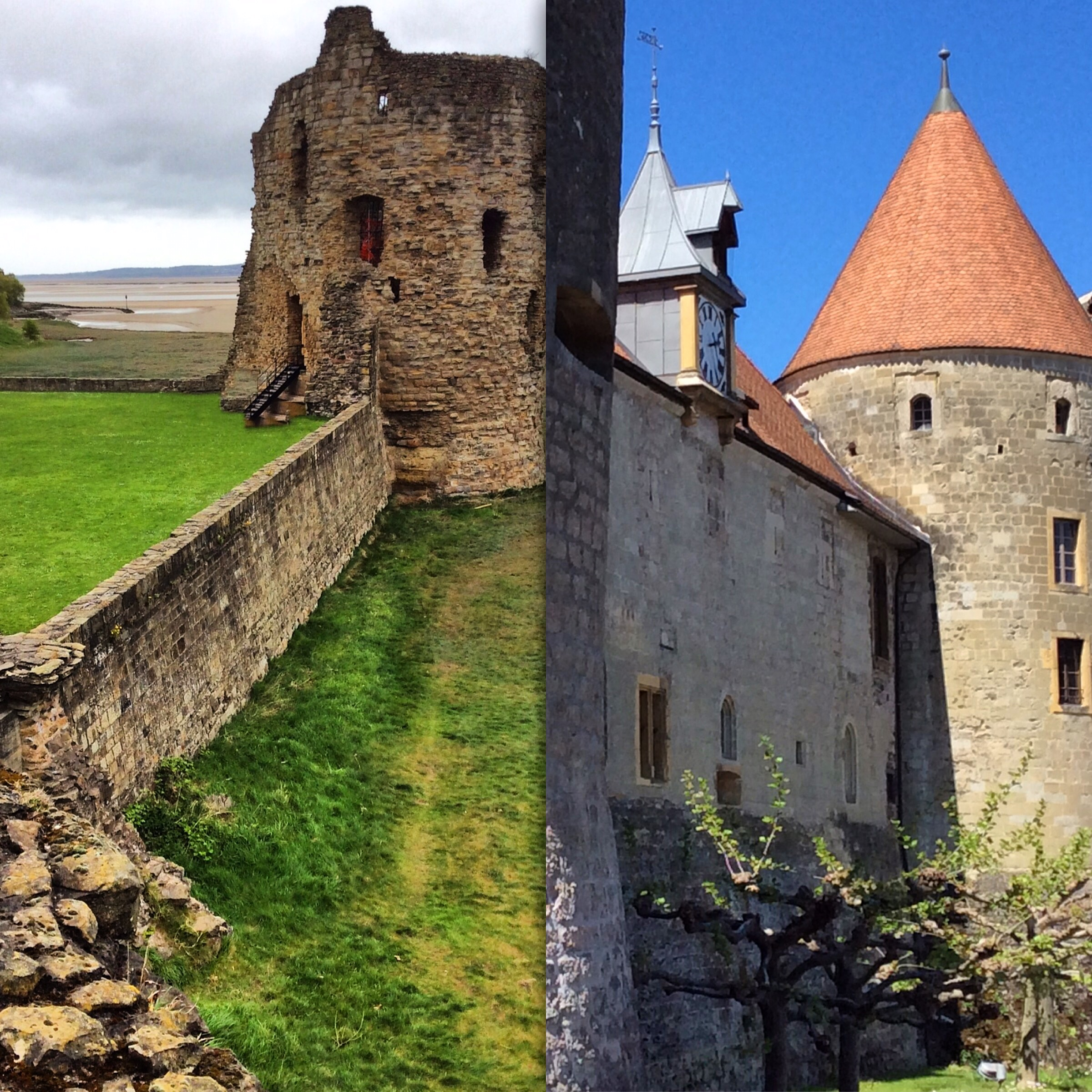
Flint Castle in North Wales compared with Yverdon-les-Bains Castle by Lake Neuchatel

He was appointed Master of the Royal Works in Wales (Magistro Jacobo de sancto Georgio, Magistro operacionum Regis in Wallia) around 1285, drawing a wage of 3s. a day. This appointment gave him control of construction in all its aspects of castles at Conwy, Caernarfon and Harlech, and primary sources link Master James to it:Castello di San Giorio di Susa as well (and reinforce the link with Conwy Castle).

An example of the way in which he brought the finer points of architecture from Savoy to north Wales are the three pinnacled merlons to be found at the it:Castello di San Giorio di Susa and at Conwy Castle. Harlech Castle, begun in 1283, was effectively completed in 1289. On 3 July 1290, James of St George was appointed Constable of Harlech Castle, succeeding John de Bonvillars who had died in August 1287. He held this position until 14 December 1293.

His final Welsh castle was Beaumaris, on which work started in April 1295. Described by historian Marc Morris as Master James' "most perfectly conceived castle", it remained unfinished on his death in 1309. Among other features introduced by James in this castle was an innovative defensive design: the outer gate was non-aligned with the inner gate meaning any intruder who penetrated the outer gate would be forced to transverse an open area on a predictable rightward path to attempt to reach the inner gate, exposed to intense defensive attacks the entire distance.

James of St George had joined Edward I in Scotland, probably around September 1298. In February 1302, James of St George was appointed to oversee to the new defences at Linlithgow. He had also worked at Stirling during the siege of 1304.

There is no record of James's wife, Ambrosia, receiving a pension after his death, so it is probable she did not survive him. He would be survived by his two sons, Giles and Tassin of Saint George.

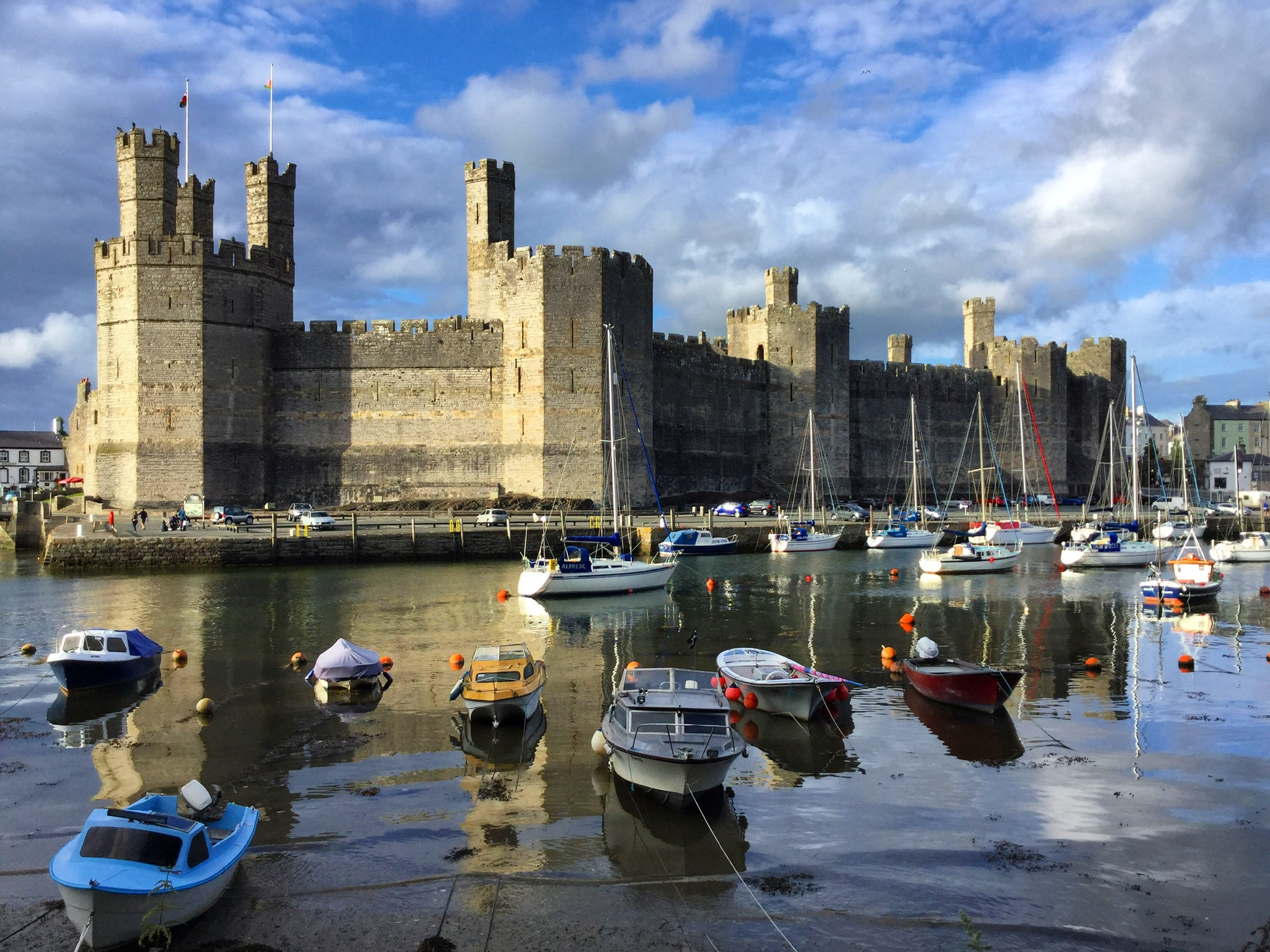
Caernarfon Castle built from 1283

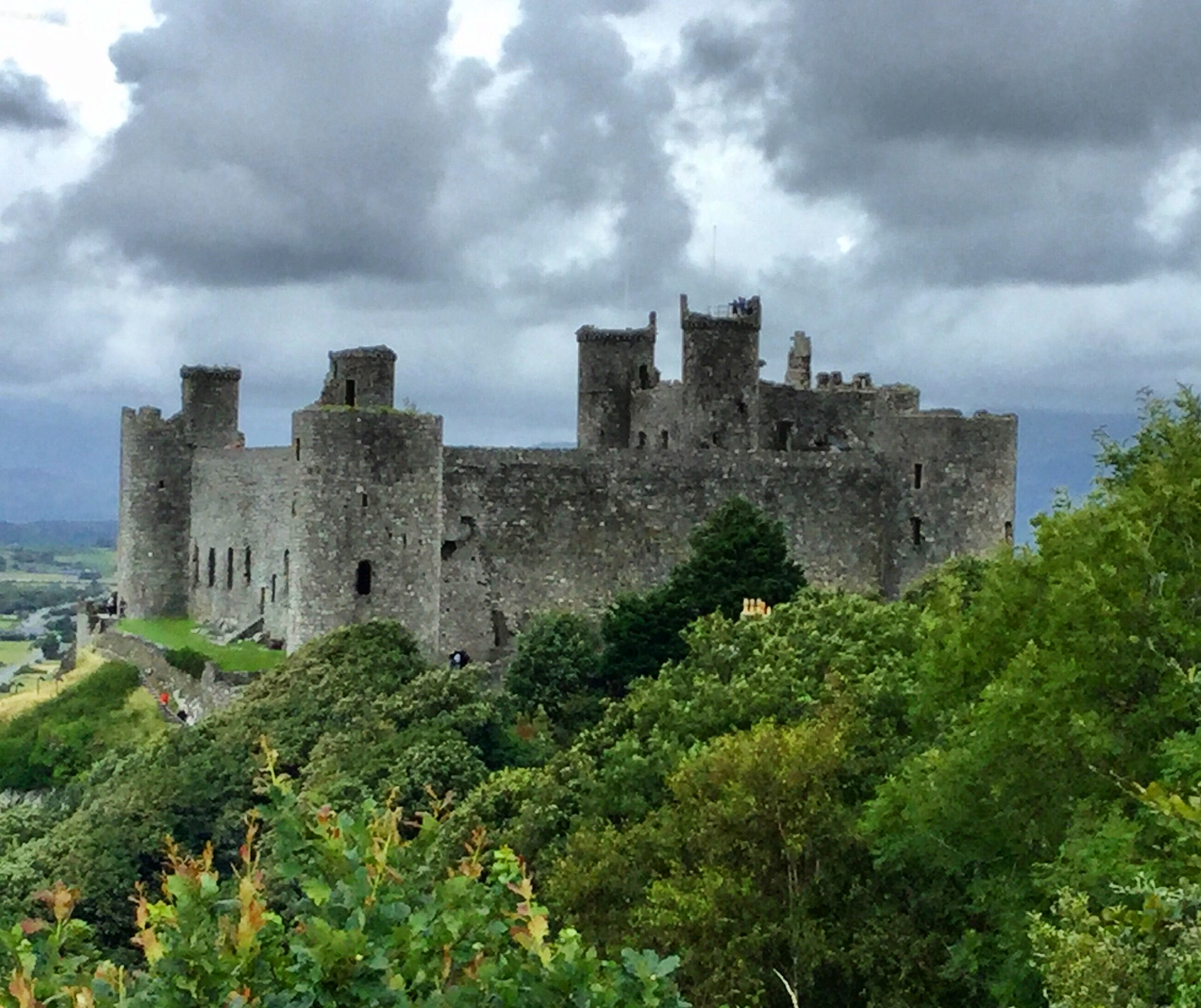
Harlech Castle built from 1283

== Bibliography ==
- Gravett, Christopher (2007). The Castles of King Edward I in Wales 1277–1307. Botley: Osprey Publishing. ISBN 978-1-78200-520-9.
- Hislop, Malcolm (2021). James of St George and the Castles of the Welsh Wars. Barnsley: Pen and Sword Books. ISBN 978-1-52674-130-1.
- Marshall, John (2022). Welsh Castle Builders. Barnsley: Pen and Sword Books. ISBN 978-1-39908-549-6.
- Marshall, John (2025). Othon de Grandson: Edward I's Loyal Knight of Renown. Barnsley: Pen and Sword Books.
- Taylor, Arnold (1985). Studies in Castles and Castle-Building. London: The Hambledon Press. ISBN 0-907628-51-6.
- Taylor, Arnold (1986). The Welsh Castles of Edward I. London: The Hambledon Press. ISBN 978-0-907628-712.
- The Impact of the Edwardian Castles in Wales. Oxford: Oxbow Books. 2010. ISBN 978-1-84217-380-0.
- Taylor, Arnold. Master James of St. George. The English Historical Review 65. pp. 433–457.
- Fryde, E. B. (1962). Book of Prests of the King's Wardrobe for 1294-5. Oxford: The Clarendon Press.
