= Bailey (castle) =

Fortified yard in a medieval castle

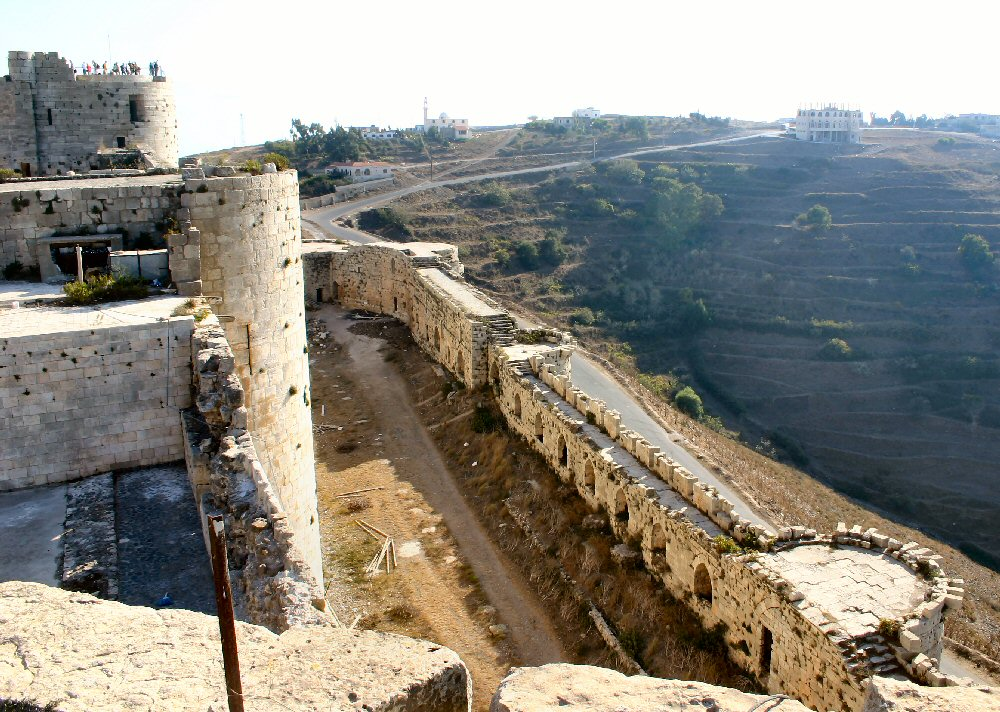
Outer (lower) bailey of Krak des Chevaliers (c. 13th century) as seen from the wall of the inner (upper) bailey

A bailey or ward in a fortification is a leveled courtyard, typically enclosed by a curtain wall. In particular, a medieval type of European castle is known as a motte-and-bailey. Castles and fortifications may have more than one bailey, and the enclosure wall building material may have been at first in wood, and later transitioned to stone. Their layout depends both on the local topography and the level of fortification technology employed, ranging from simple enclosures to elaborate concentric defences. In addition to the gradual evolution of more complex fortification plans, there are also significant differences in regional traditions of military architecture regarding subdivisions into baileys.

== Upper, lower, middle, inner and outer wards or baileys ==
Baileys can be arranged in sequence along a hill (as in a spur castle), as upper and lower baileys. They can also be nested one inside the other, as in a concentric castle, giving an outer and inner bailey. Large castles may have two outer baileys; if in line they may form an outer and middle bailey. On the other hand, tower houses lack an enclosed bailey.

The most important and prestigious buildings, such as the great hall and the keep or bergfried, were usually located in the inner bailey of the castle, sometimes called the central bailey or main bailey. Nonetheless, there are a few castles where the keep is outside the inner bailey, such as Château de Dourdan and Flint Castle. The lower or outer bailey often held less important structures, such as stables, if there was not enough space in the inner bailey.

Outer baileys could also be largely defensive in function, without significant buildings. In the concentric castles of the military orders in the crusader states such as Krak des Chevaliers or Belvoir Fortress, the inner bailey resembled a cloistered monastery, while the outer bailey was little more than a narrow passage between the concentric enceintes. In general, baileys could have any shape, including irregular or elongated ones, when the walls followed the contour lines of the terrain where the castle was sited. Rectangular shapes are very common (as in castra and quadrangular castles).

A particularly complex arrangement of baileys can be found at Château Gaillard. There is both a lower bailey separated from the main castle by a deep ditch, and a concentric arrangement inside the main castle with an inner and middle bailey.

== Holy Roman Empire ==
In the Germanic castles of the Holy Roman Empire, there is a distinction between a Vorburg and a Kernburg roughly corresponding to lower and upper baileys in English castles. In German-speaking countries, many castles had double curtain walls with a narrow enclosure outside the main walls, acting as a killing ground between them, referred to as a Zwinger (from zwingen 'to force'). The outermost wall was a Zwingermauer or type of low mantlet wall. These were often added at vulnerable points like the gate of a castle or town, but were rarely as fully developed as in the concentric castles in Wales or the Crusader castles.

== Gallery with examples of castle wards ==
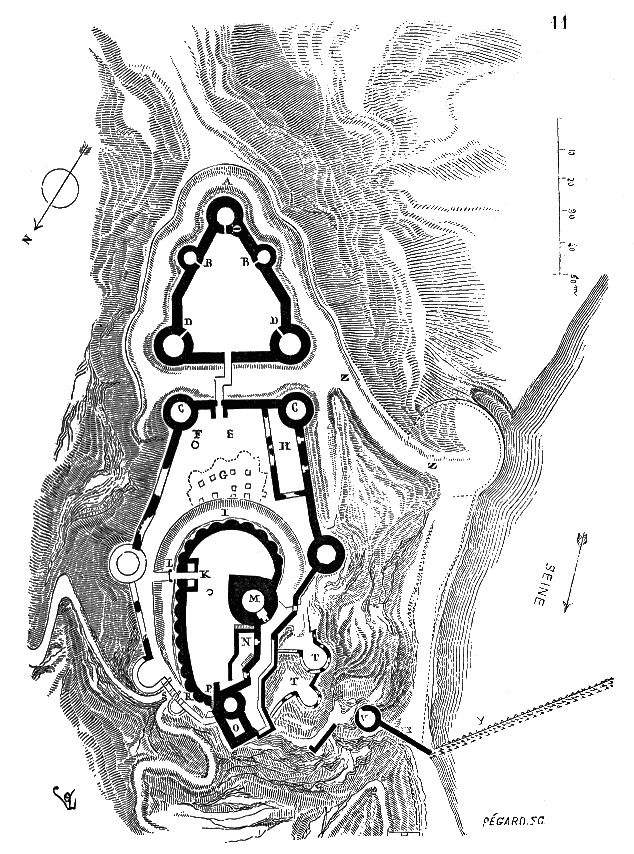
Château Gaillard in France had an elaborate sequence of outer and inner baileys

Château de Dourdan, France, with the keep just outside the inner bailey

The inner and outer baileys of the Château de Puilaurens, France (in yellow)

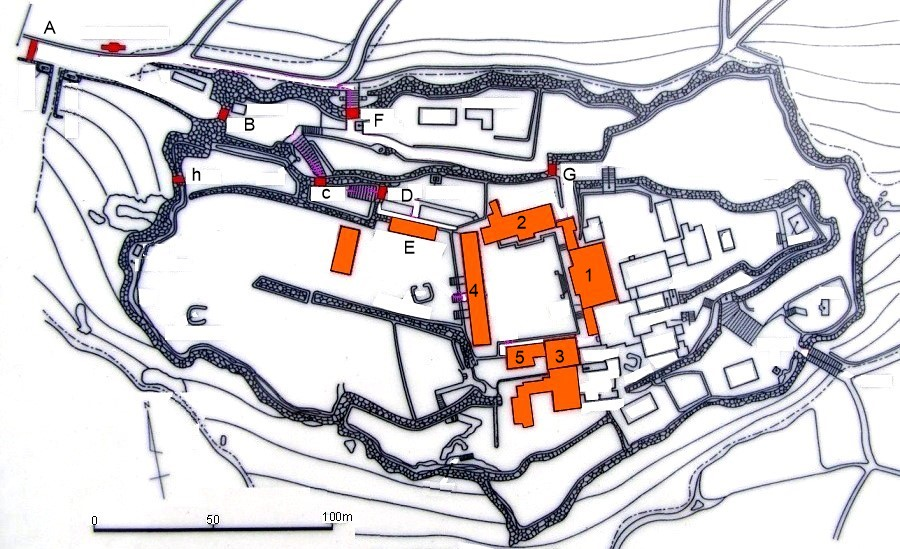
Layout of Shuri Castle in Japan; multiple baileys were built around the main hall

== See also ==
- Old Bailey
