= Jean Cotereel =

Architect

Jean Cotereel was the principal architect of Lausanne Cathedral in the early thirteenth century. He was later responsible for the fortified burgh of Saint-Prex and some historians believe Yverdon Castle. The "English influence" of his design style have led some historians to speculate that he might have been English or had English ancestry. The suggestion that he may have been the Master Jean involved at Yverdon Castle would make him the father of renowned castle builder Master James of Saint George.

Christopher Wilson writing Lausanne and Canterbury a ‘Special Relationship’ reconsidered in the German language publication Die Kathedrale von Lausanne und ihr Marienportal im Kontext der europäischen Gotik of 2004 concurred suggesting that Cotereel drew "heavily on contemporary English sources and thereby . . . set himself apart from all of his fellow exponents of the French gothic tradition." Earlier Wilson had agreed with the basic English origins of the Cotereel family, writing "Cotereel was the son of the architect who began the walls of the choir [at Lausanne] and that the latter was of English origin."

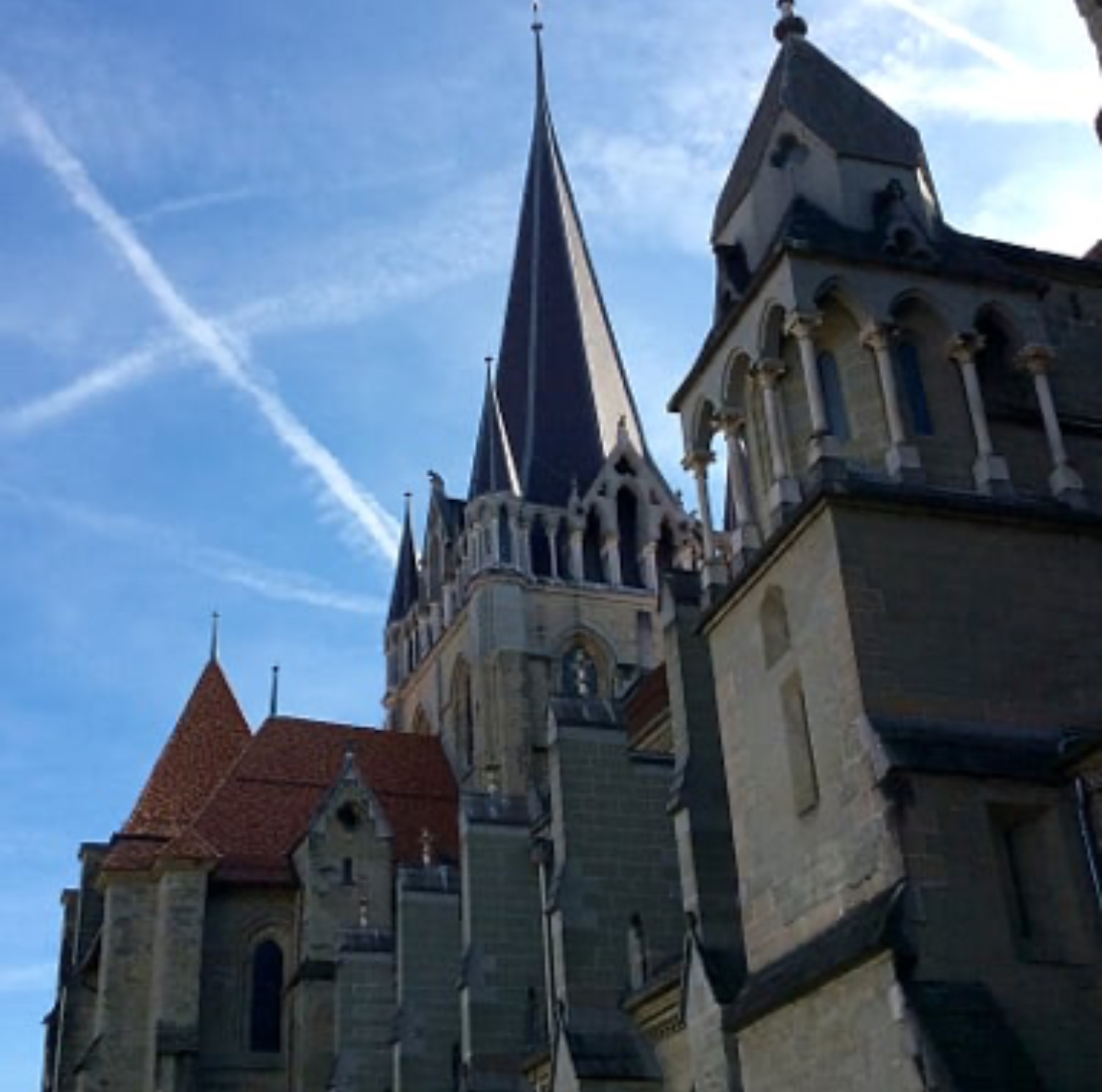
Lausanne Cathedral

Swiss historian Marcel Grandjean had earlier written. This English influence – that of Canterbury especially – which appears, according to Bony, through the elevation and proportions of the choir of Lausanne, the pillars of larger and smaller double columns, capitals with cross abacus, the fenestration of the passageway, etc. we would be tempted to see it also in Lausanne in other parts of the building: in the plan of the cathedral and in the great primitive entrance.

The plan of the transept offers indeed, with its chapel wide open on the ground floor of the towers, the beginning of an oriental aisle, typical of English Gothic where the Cistercian influence strong reset (Durham, Salisbury, Lincoln, Beverley Minster, Rochester etc. in England, Lisieux and Sées only in Normandy).

As for the great western entrance, it is close to English Gothic, if not by its very principle – of which France gives no equivalent, but of which England offers similar versions in Peterborough (early thirteenth century), in Lincoln (middle of the thirteenth century) – in any case by the shape of its arch, whose feet are constituted by two floors of délit small columns surrounding a central column, the first completely detached from the wall, the second supporting the broken arch: this entry strikingly reminds of the general appearance of the pillars blocking the transept crossing of Canterbury (around 1177), which presents the same rhythm and the same type of decoration."

Grandjean had also confirmed that Cotereel was a family name unknown in [Vaud] and was of Anglo Norman origin.

From 1236 Jean Cotereel had two roles, the aforesaid magister operacionis Lausannensis and castellanus sancti Prothasii – Master of the Lausanne works and Castellan of Saint-Prex. Jean Cotereel had been granted the fief of Saint-Prex as the town history says: “Son fils ainé devra y résider après lui et le fief ne devra pas être divisé” meaning that his eldest son would have to remain there after Jean and the fief be not divided. The eldest son, however, did not inherit the fief because the castellan is reported as Jean Bergier from 1282.

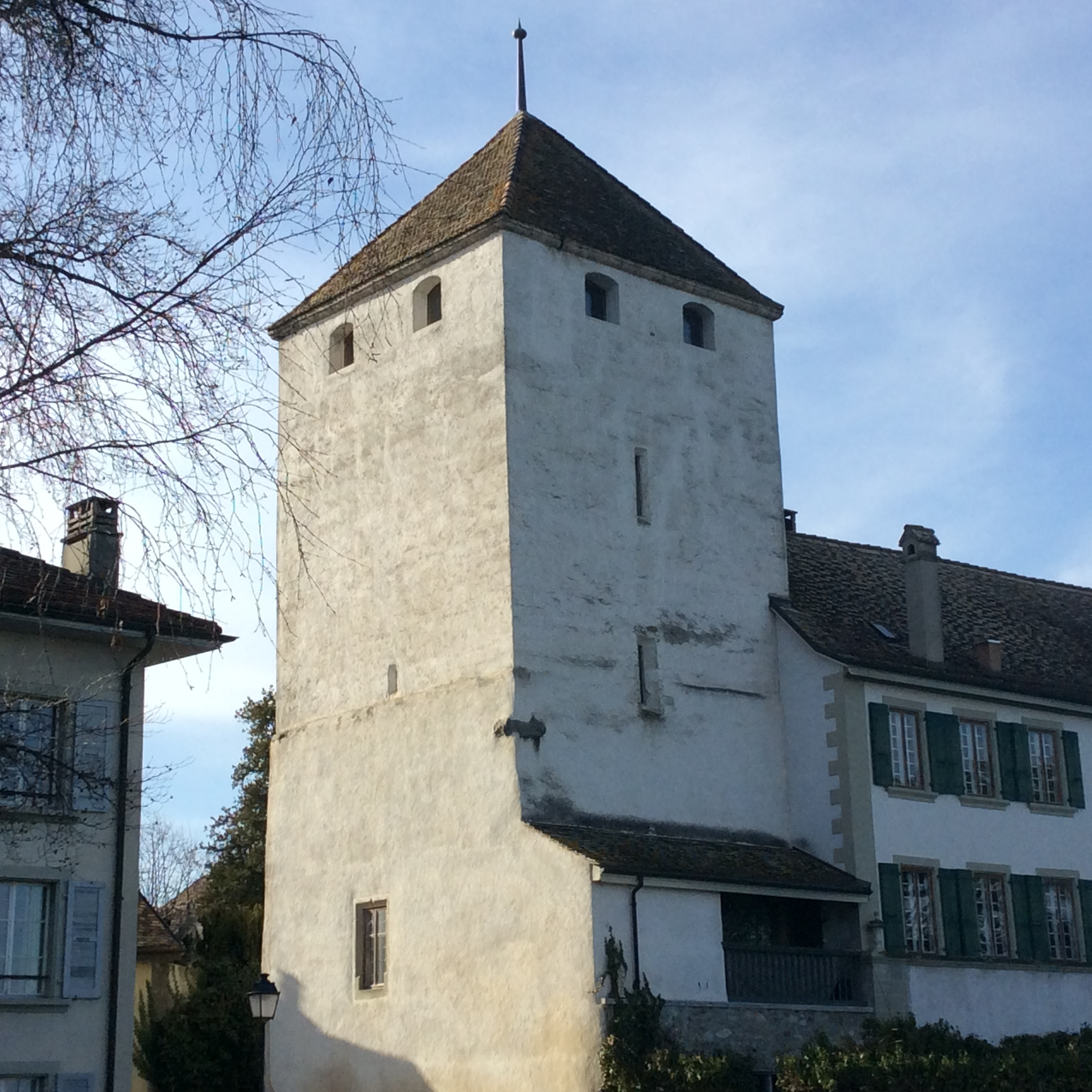
Saint-Prex castle

A. J. Taylor believed that there was strong circumstantial evidence for Jean Cotereel being the Master Jean cited as having been involved in the initial building of Yverdon Castle Savoyard records attach the name Jean Cotereel to castle building in addition to the aforesaid cathedral work for which he is most known, his confirmed castle work included building for Peter II, Count of Savoy at Saillon.
