= La Bâtiaz Castle =

Castle in Canton of Valais, Switzerland

- Martigny
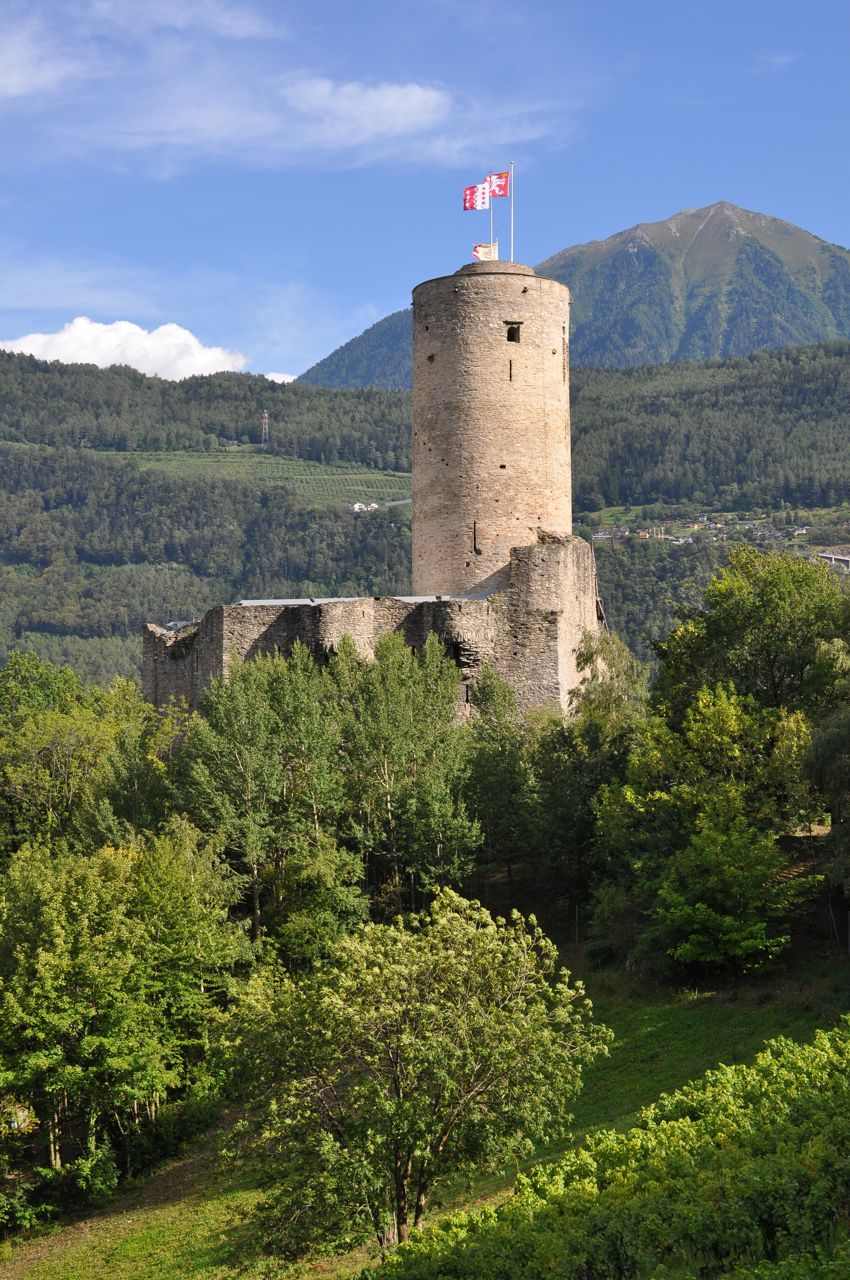
- La Bâtiaz

Site information
- Type: hill castle
- Code: CH-VS
- Open to the public: Yes
- Condition: correct conservation
- Website: www.batiaz.ch

Location
- Location within Canton of Valais Location within Switzerland
- Coordinates: 46°06′18″N 7°04′09″E
- Height: 800m

Site history
- Built: between 1206 and 1237

La Bâtiaz Castle (French: Château de la Bâtiaz) is a castle in the municipality of Martigny, in the Canton of Valais, Switzerland. It is a Swiss heritage site of national significance.

The garderobes (toilets) at La Bâtiaz played a part in determining that the architect for some UNESCO listed castles in Wales came from Savoy. Historian and custodian A. J. Taylor travelled to La Bâtiaz and noticed that the castle and the one at Harlech shared a specific unique feature in toilet design. The discovery enabled Taylor to confirm that James of Saint George had been the architect of both.

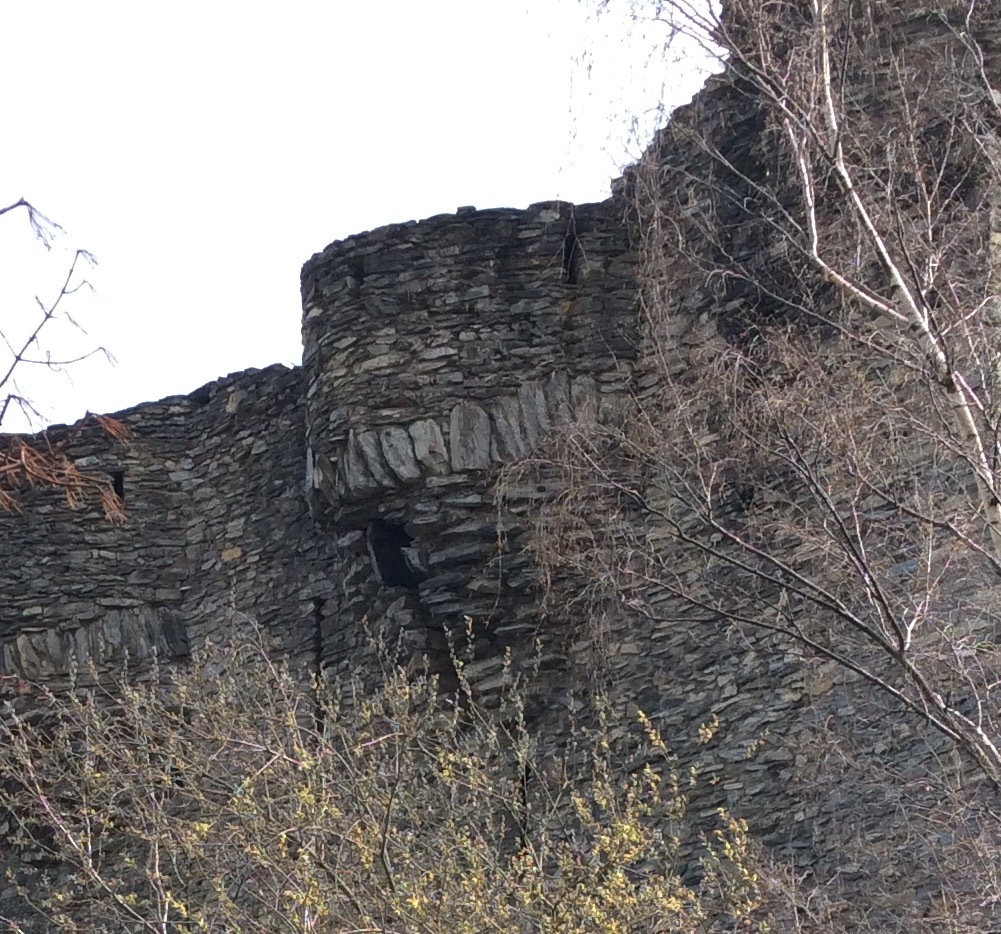
Castle toilets at La Bâtiaz

== See also ==
- List of castles in Switzerland
- Château
