= Flint Castle =

Ruined 13th century castle in Flintshire, Wales

- Castell y Fflint (Welsh) (Note: Since 2024, Cadw, who maintain the site, are to use the Welsh name only, but have not yet done so as of 2026.)
- Flint, Wales
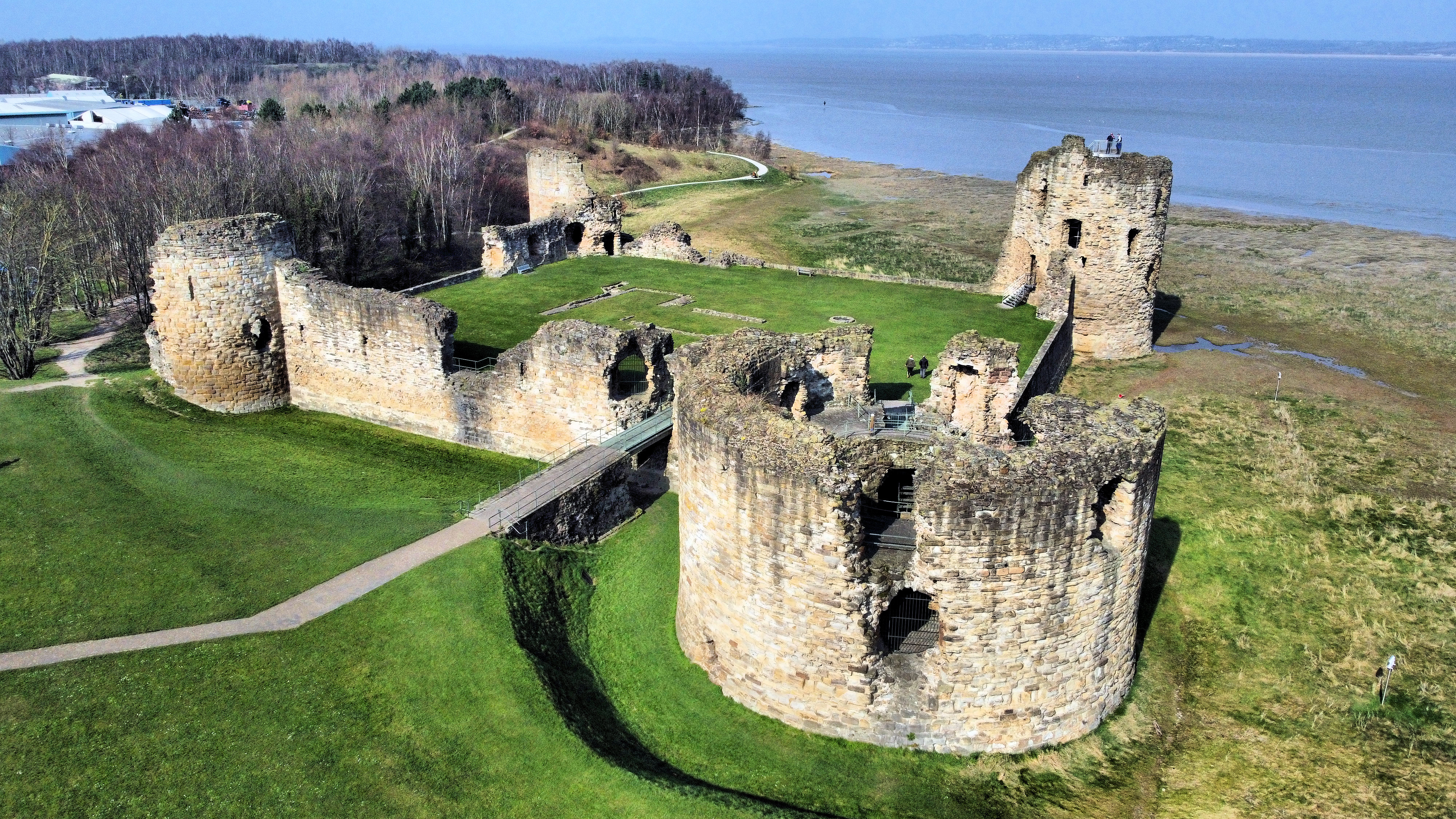
- The castle ruins

Site information
- Type: Rectangular enclosure castle with isolated corner donjon
- Owner: Cadw
- Condition: Ruin
- Website: Flint Castle (Cadw)

Location
- Location in north-east Wales
- Location within Wales
- Coordinates: 53.251786°N 3.129956°W

Site history
- Built: 1277–1284
- Built by: Richard L'Engenour; Later work attributed to James of Saint George
- In use: Open to public
- Materials: Millstone Grit; Sandstone
- Events: Welsh Wars; English Civil War

Listed Building – Grade I

Flint Castle (Welsh: Castell y Fflint) in Flint, Flintshire, was the first of a series of castles built during King Edward I's campaign to conquer Wales.

The site was chosen for its strategic position in North East Wales. The castle was only one day's march from Chester, supplies could be brought along the River Dee and there was a ford nearby across to England that could be used at low tide.

== Construction ==
Building work began in 1277 initially under Richard L'engenour, who would later become Mayor of Chester in 1304. The castle and its earthworks were built by 18,000 labourers and masons using local Millstone Grit ashlar and sandstone. Savoyard master mason James of Saint George was assigned "ad ordiandum opera castorum ibidem" (to undertake the works of the same castle works (referring to all Welsh castle building projects) in April 1278. November 1280 saw him beginning directly overseeing construction at Flint for Edward I as the initially very slow construction pace was accelerated. He remained at the castle for 17 months. James of Saint George then moved onto Rhuddlan to oversee its completion.

When work ceased in 1284, Flint Castle had an inner ward and an outer bailey. They were separated by a tidal moat and were connected with gatehouse and drawbridge. A plantation town was also laid out beyond the outer bailey. The inner ward had three large towers and a detached keep. This isolated tower protected the inner gatehouse and outer bailey. In total expenditure, Edward I spent £6068.7.5d. creating the fortress and the town (£6.6 million in 2008). (Note: Comparing relative average earnings of £6,068 in 1307 with 2008.)

Flint, on the western shore of the River Dee estuary, could be supplied by river or sea. Its harbour was protected by a defensive wall. The castle lies opposite to the English shore and Shotwick Castle in England. Before the course was changed in the 18th century, passage across the estuary at this point could be made directly by boat at high tide or by fording at low tide.

== Unique fortress design ==
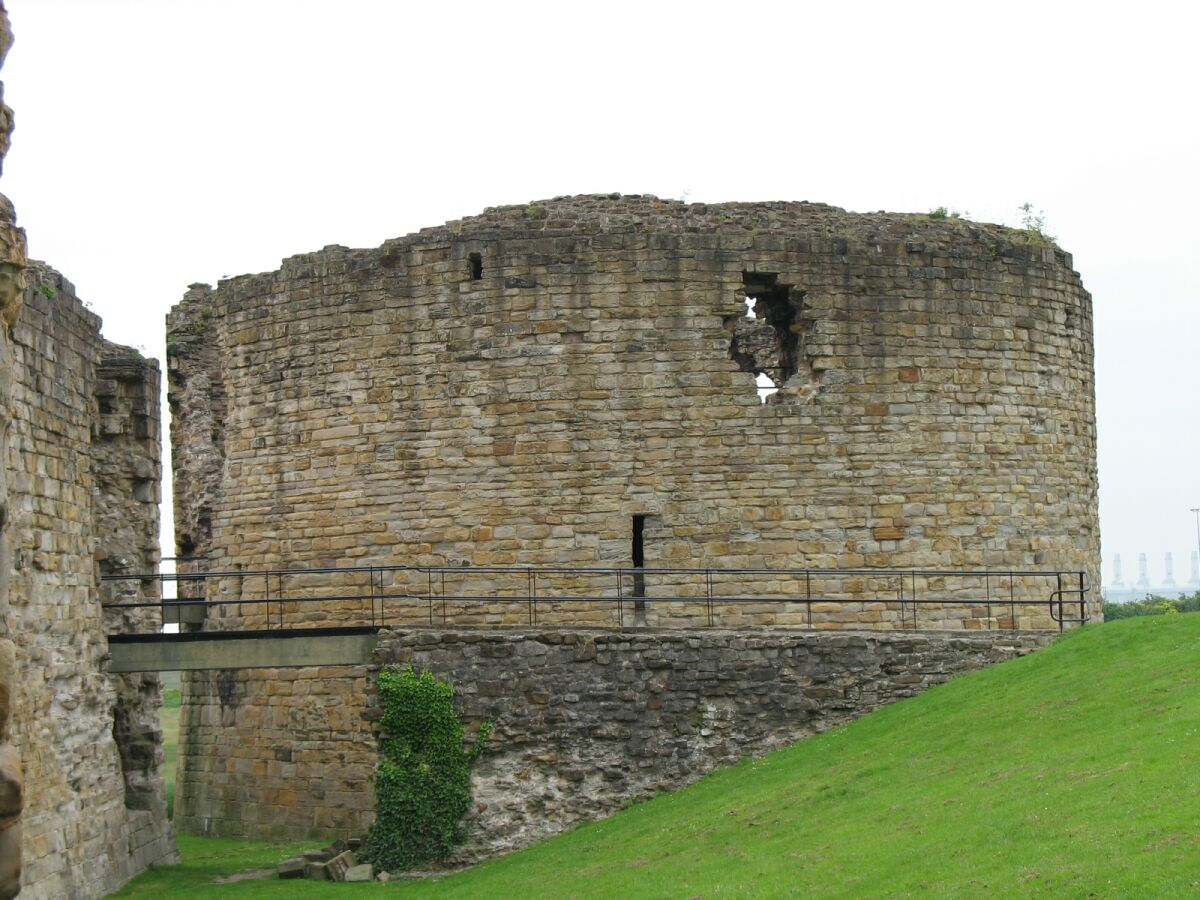
The isolated keep defended the gateway and drawbridge between the inner ward and outer bailey.

The castle is based on Savoyard models where one of the corner towers is enlarged and isolated. This independent structure served as both corner tower and keep or donjon, like at Dourdan, France. Flint's keep has been compared to the donjon at Aigues-Mortes, France. Edward I may have been familiar with Aigues-Mortes having passed through the fortress on the way to join the Eighth Crusade in 1270. An alternative possibility is the influence of Jean Mésot on James of Saint George, Mésot having worked in Southern France before influencing Saint George in Savoy. The castle at Flint has also been described as a "classic Carrė Savoyard" as it is very similar to Yverdon Castle. Its ground dimensions are a third bigger but it shares the classic shape and style, along with the use of a corner tower as keep (donjon). Most historians attribute this to input from Edward's premier architect and castle builder James of Saint George Although construction began in 1277 and James of Saint George didn't begin work at Flint until 1280, he was in England from 1278 and was described as "ad ordinandum opera castorum ibidem", that is, charged with the design of the works at Flint.

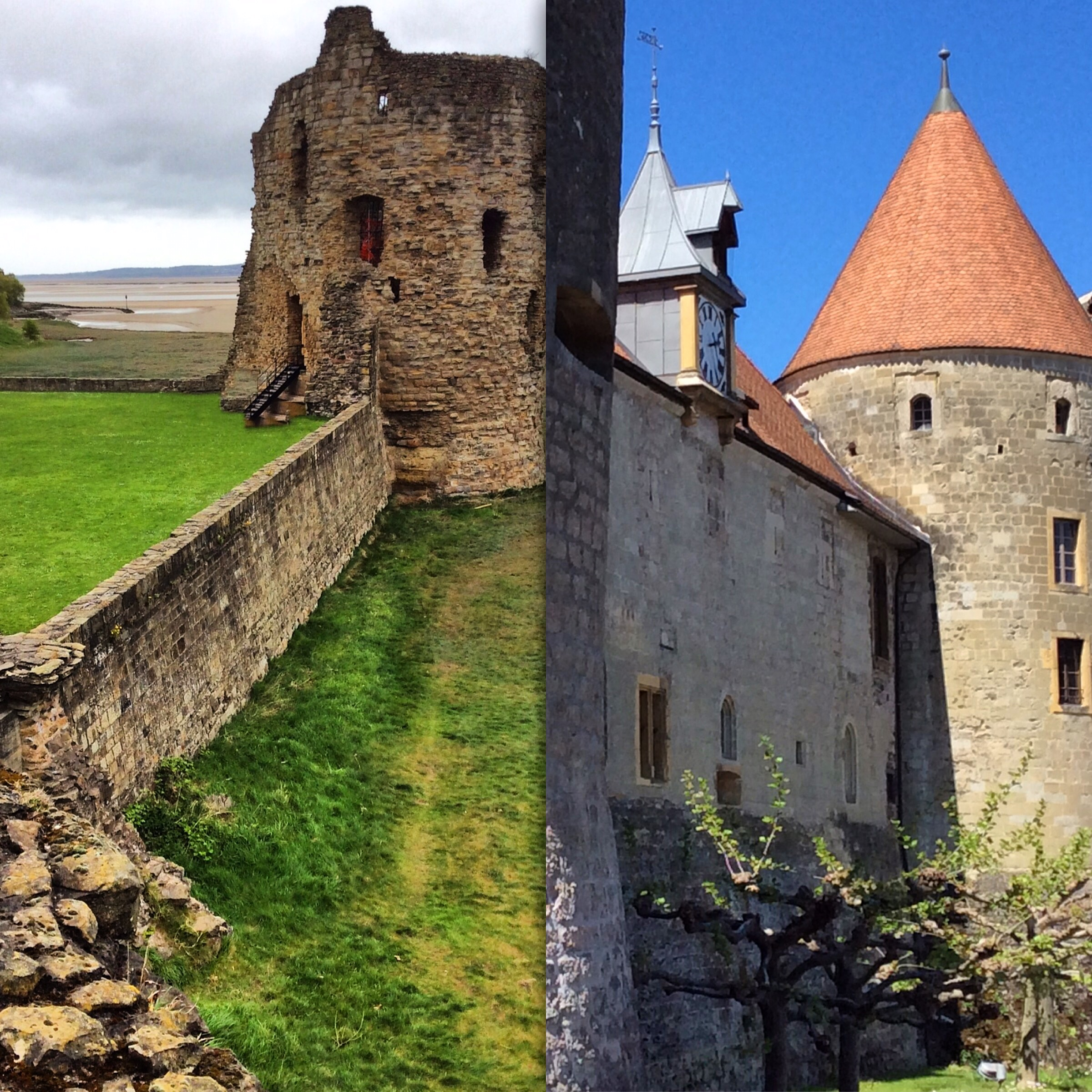
Flint Castle in North Wales compared with Chateau Yverdon by Lake Neuchatel

The keep is an impressive structure. Its stone walls are 7 metres (23 ft) thick at the base and 5 metres (16 ft) above. Access was gained by crossing a drawbridge into a central entrance chamber on the first floor. Originally there would have been at least one additional storey. These floors had small rooms built into the thick walls. A timber gallery was built on top of the keep for the visit of Edward, Prince of Wales, in 1301. On the ground floor is a vaulted passage that runs all the way around the inside of the keep.

Flint's design was not repeated in any other castle built by Edward I in North Wales. The layout at Flint remains unique within the British Isles.

== History ==
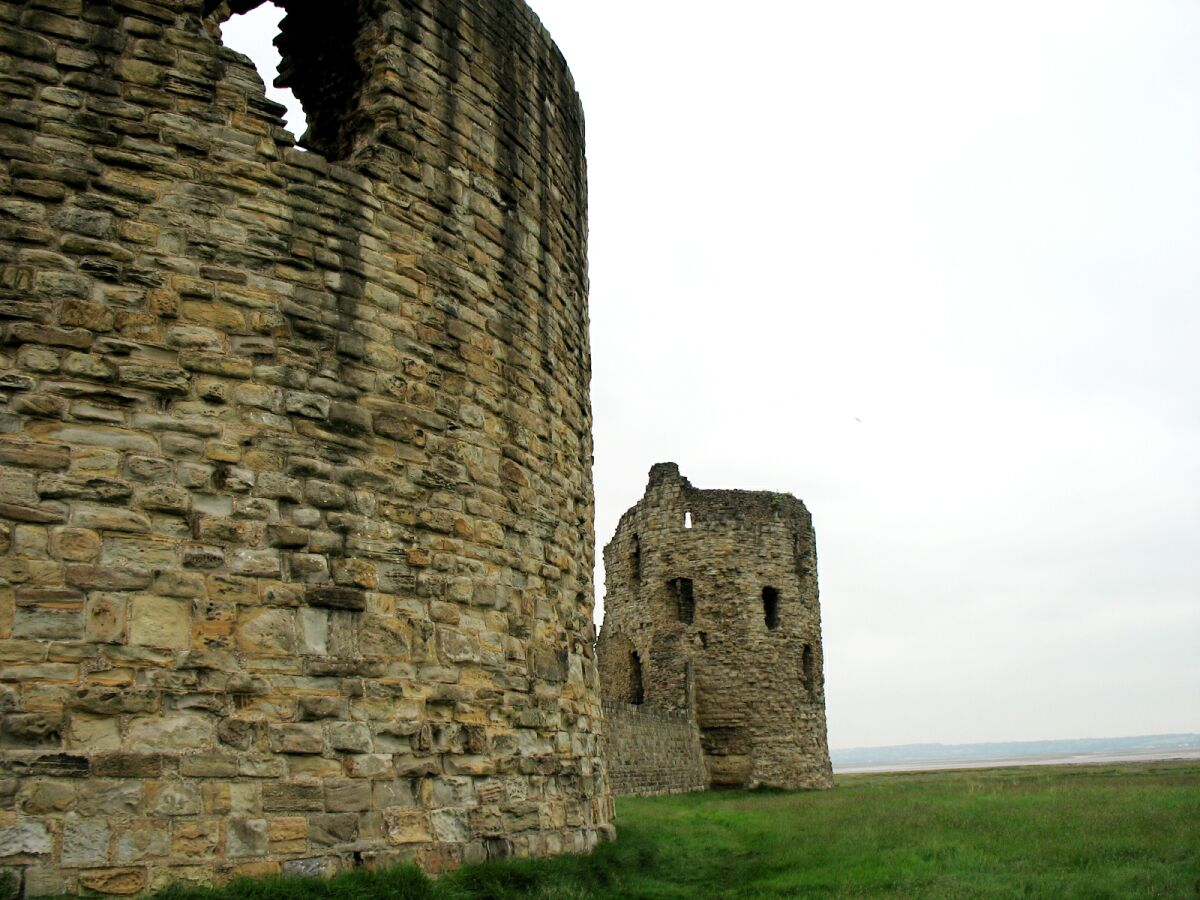
The massive stone keep, curtain wall and three-storey corner tower.

Flint was the first castle of what would later become known as Edward I's "Iron Ring". A chain of fortresses designed to encircle North Wales and oppress the Welsh. Its construction began almost immediately after Edward I began the First Welsh War in 1277.

Five years later Welsh forces under the command of Dafydd ap Gruffydd, brother of Llywelyn ap Gruffudd, besieged the castle in an attempted uprising against the English Crown. In 1294 Flint was attacked again during the revolt of Madog ap Llywelyn; this time the constable of the castle was forced to set fire to the fortress to prevent its capture by the Welsh. The castle was later repaired and partly rebuilt.

With the conclusion to the Welsh Wars, English settlers and merchants were given property titles in the new town that was laid out in front of the castle. The plantation borough was protected by a defensive ditch with a wooden palisade on earth banking . Its outline remains visible in streets patterns.

In 1399 Richard II of England was held by Henry Bolingbroke at Flint before being returned to London.

During the English Civil War, Flint Castle was held by the Royalists. It was finally captured by the Parliamentarians in 1647 after a three-month siege. To prevent its reuse in the conflict, the castle was then slighted in accordance with Cromwell's destruction order. The ruins are what remain today.

By the 19th century part of the site's outer bailey was used as Flintshire's County Jail. A quarry operated nearby.

== Present day ==
Flint Castle is maintained by Cadw, a Welsh-government body that protects, conserves and promotes the building heritage of Wales. Access is free and via a path. Most parts of the castle, such as the isolated keep, are open to the public. A spiral staircase was installed in the north east tower in 2017, from where a platform gives views over the Dee Estuary. A giant iron ring sculpture was due to be placed in the castle grounds but was seen as divisive and the project was shelved — the architects said the sculpture represented the "unstable nature of the crown", but critics interpreted the symbol as representing the subjugation of the Welsh people.

Since 2024, Cadw are to standardise the name in both languages, to use the Welsh name Castell y Fflint in English. Although they have not yet done so as of 2026.

== Later works ==
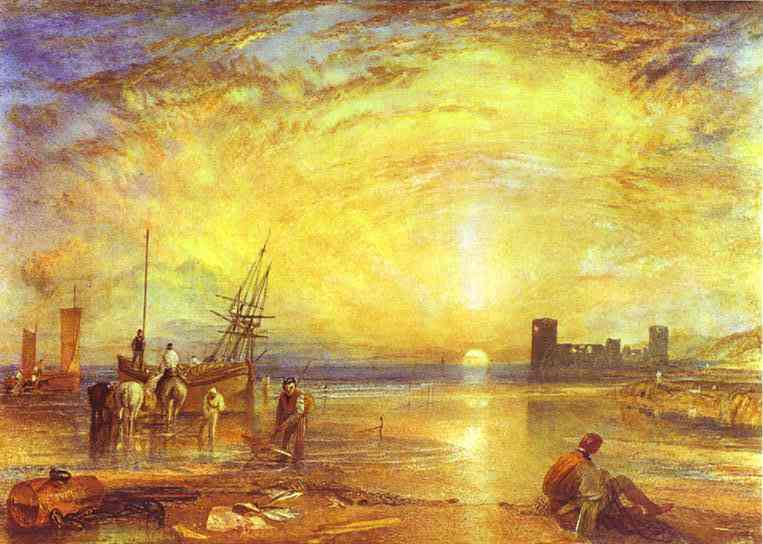
1838 watercolour painting of Flint Castle by J. M. W. Turner

In 1838 J. M. W. Turner painted a watercolour of the castle.

HMS Flint Castle (K383) was a Royal Navy Castle-class corvette launched in 1943, named after Flint Castle.

== Constable ==
From 1284 to 1935 the Constable of Flint Castle served ex officio as the Mayor of Flint. The constable's residence was, prior to its destruction, in the donjon tower.

=== List of Constables ===
- 1278–1281: Gerard de St Laurent
- 1282: William de Perton
- 1284–: Reginald de Grey (1st Mayor of Flint)
- c.1288: William de la Leye
- 1290–1295: Reginald de Grey
- 1294: Sir Edward de Laye
- 1300–:William de Mascy
- 1306: William Broun
- ?–1307: William de Ormesby
- 1307–1309: Robert de Holland
- 1309–1311: Payn Tybotot
- 1311–1312: Robert de Holland
- 1322–?: Oliver de Ingham
- 1328–?: Oliver de Ingham
- ?–1341: Henry de Ferrers
- 1341–:William de Beauchamp and Hugh de Berewyk
- 1349: Rhys ap Robert – (jointly)
- c.1351–c.1357: Ithel ap Cyfrig Sais
- C.1364: David de Backarn
- 1373–1383: Ralph de Davenport
- c.1385: Roger Coughill
- 1390–1396: John Golafre
- 1396–: Nicholas Hauberk
- 1399–1403: Henry Hotspur Percy
- c.1404–1407: Nicholas Hauberk
- 1407–1416: Roger Leche
- 1417–1458: Sir Thomas Rempston
- 1572: Lancelot Bostock
- ?–1664: Thomas Edwards
- 1664–?: Ralph Whitley
- 1687–1689: Sir John Trevor and William Eyton – (jointly)
- 1689–1696: Thomas Whitley
- 1702–1705: Sir Roger Mostyn, 3rd Baronet
- 1705–?1715: Sir John Trevor (died 1717)
- 1715–1718: Sir Roger Mostyn, 3rd Baronet
- c.1734–1750: Sir George Wynne
- 1750–?: Other Windsor, 4th Earl of Plymouth (died 1771)
- 1775–?1798: Owen Salusbury Brereton (died 1798)
- 1799–1808: Watkin Williams
- 1910–1933: John Herbert Lewis
- 1934–1935: Henry Gladstone, 1st Baron Gladstone of Hawarden
- 1935–1967: Albert Gladstone

== Gallery ==
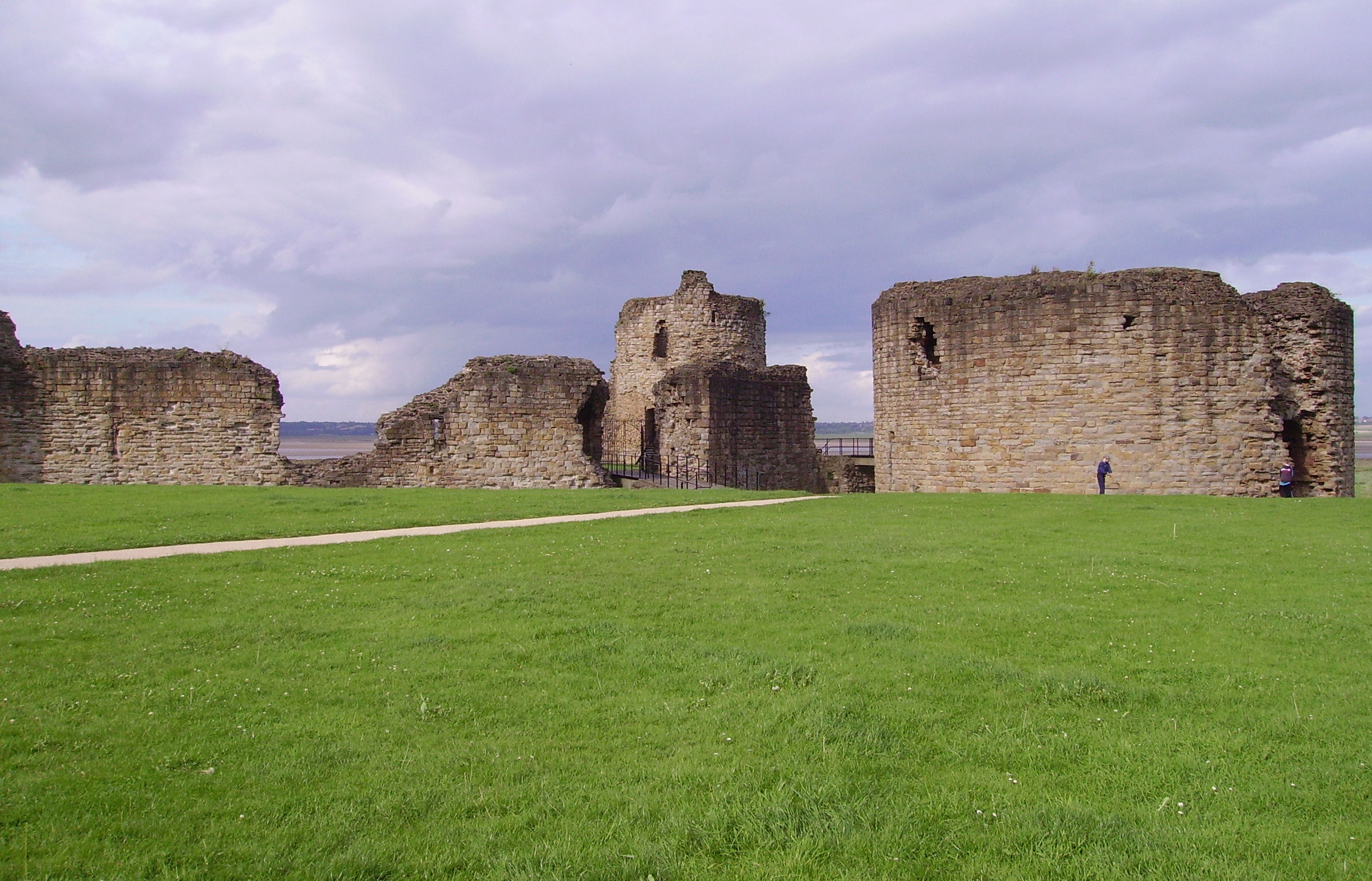
Flint Castle with its isolated donjon (right).

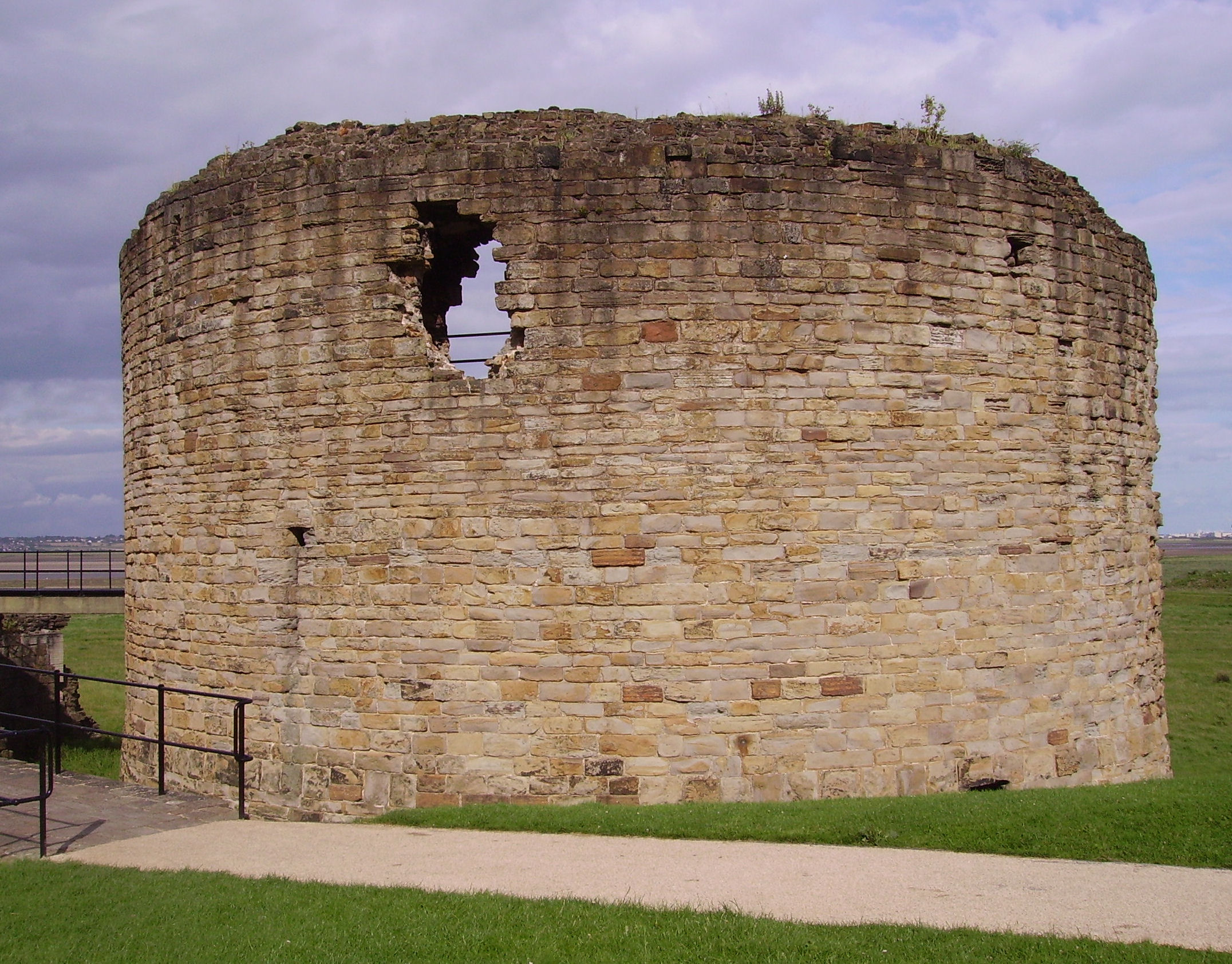
The stone keep beside the gate to the inner bailey.

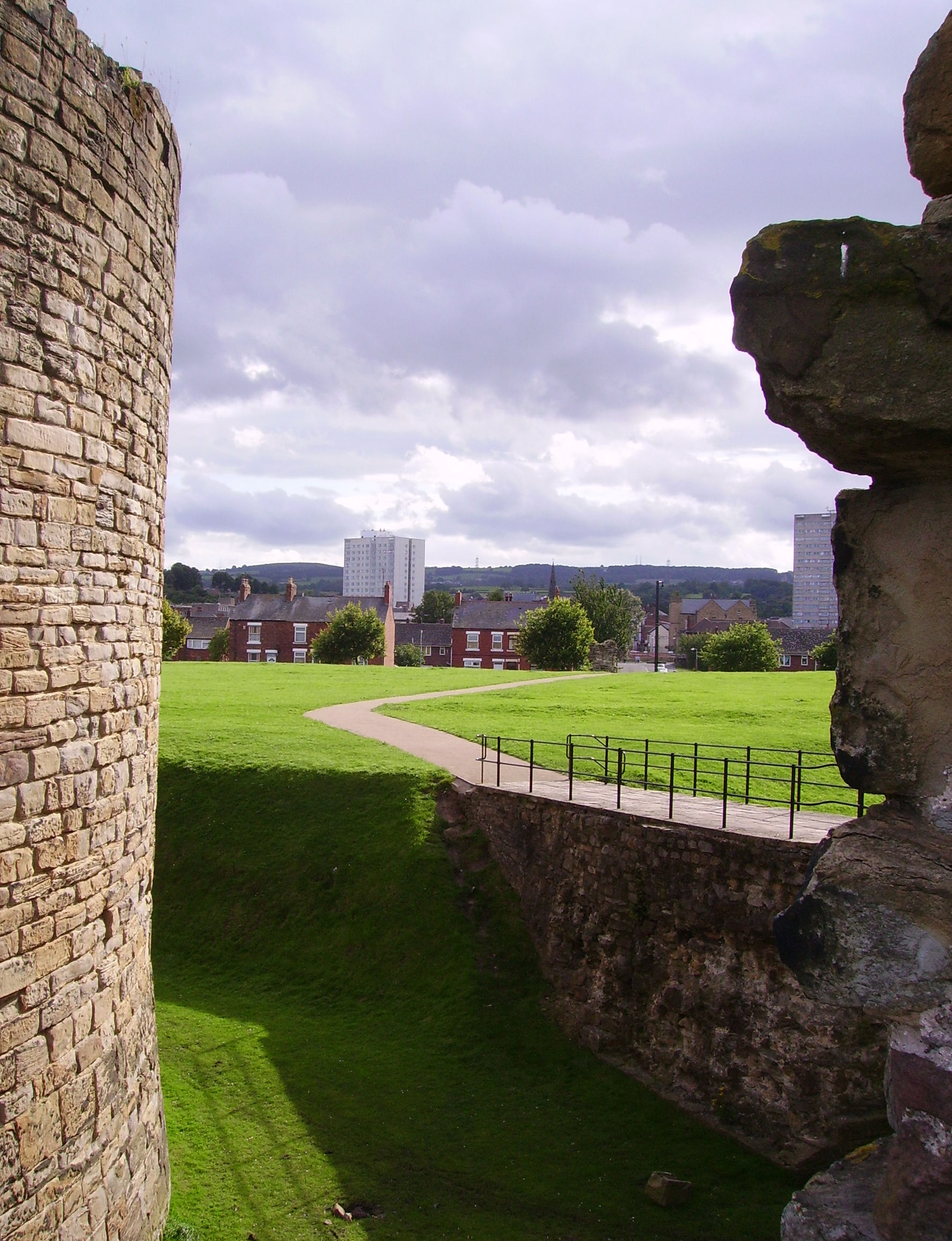
View across the moat to the outer bailey.

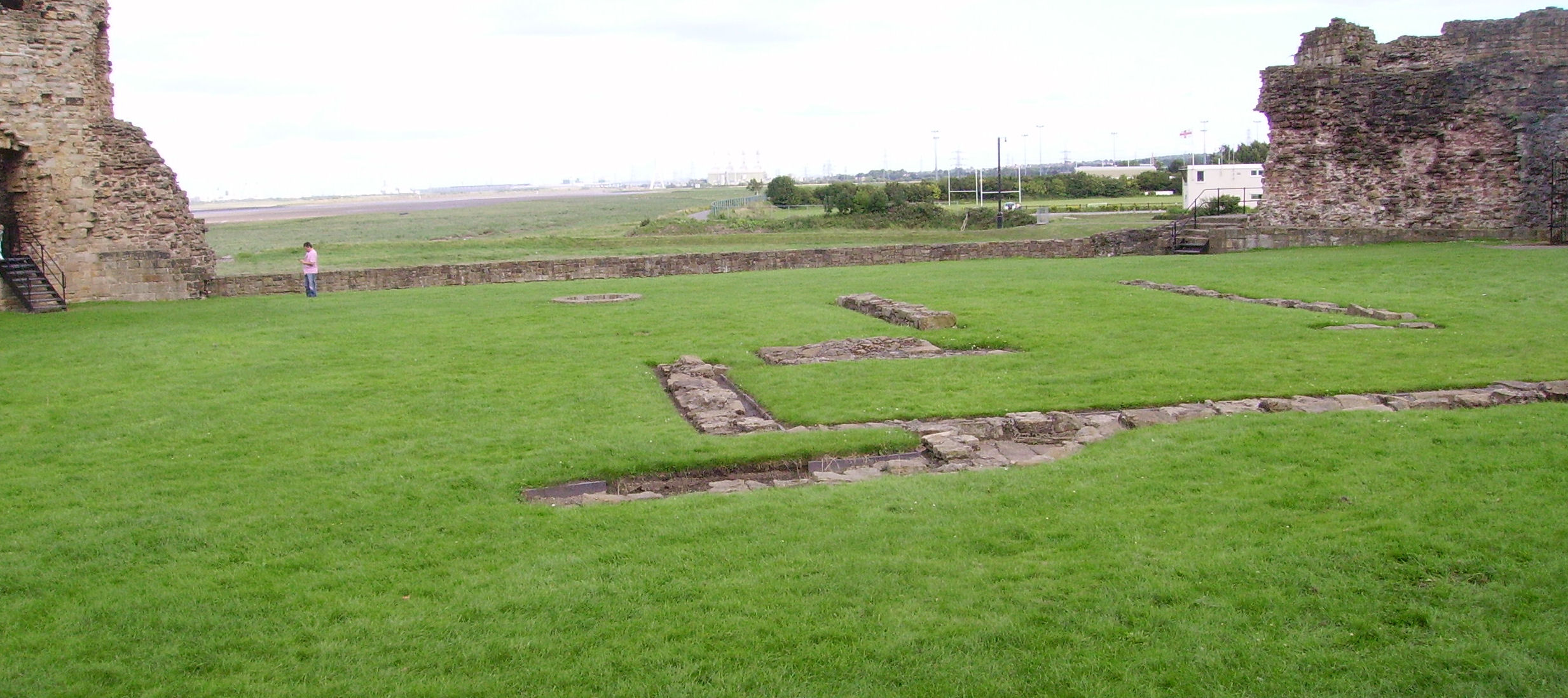
Building foundations within the inner ward.

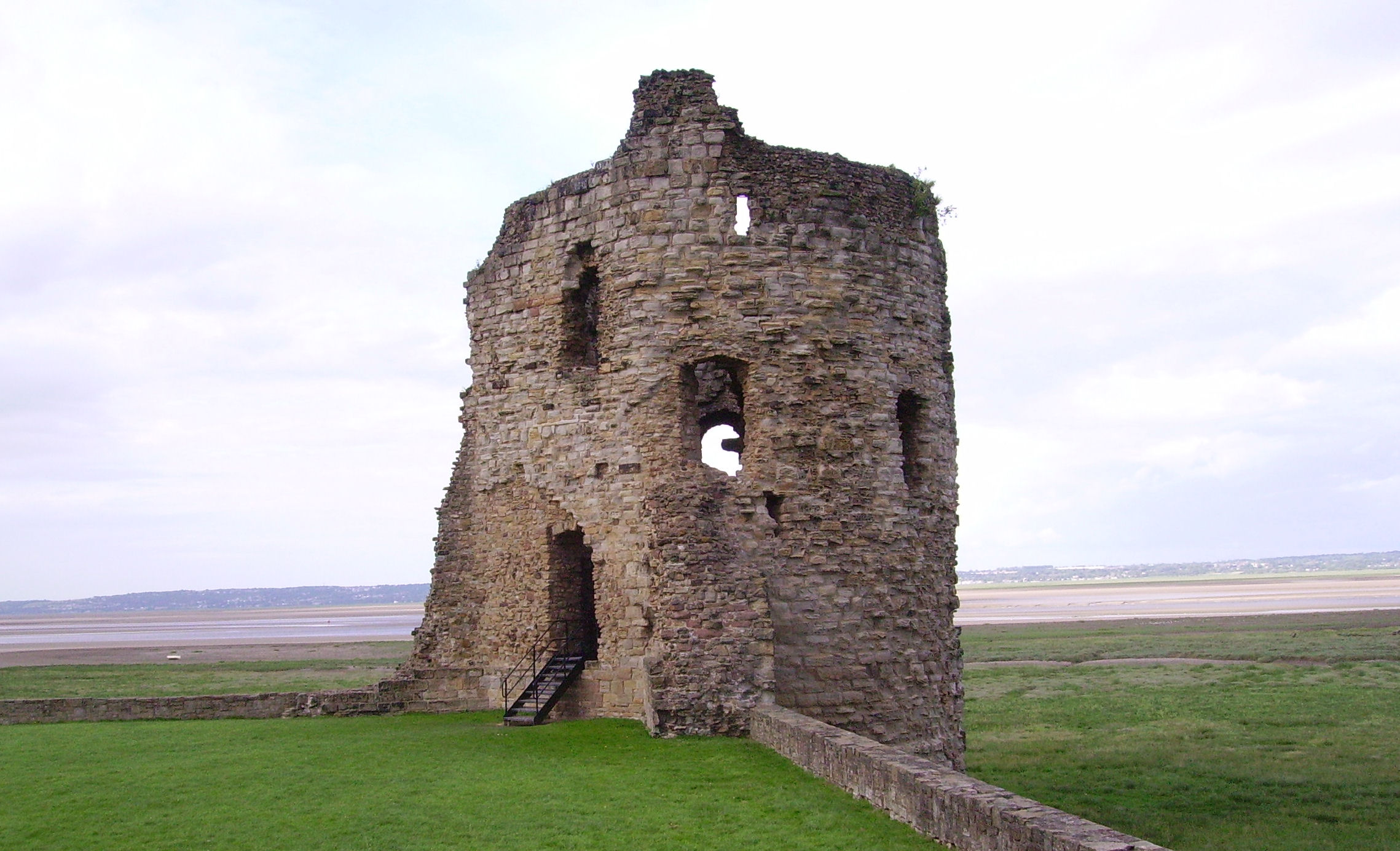
The eastern three-storey corner tower in the inner ward with the Dee Estuary beyond.

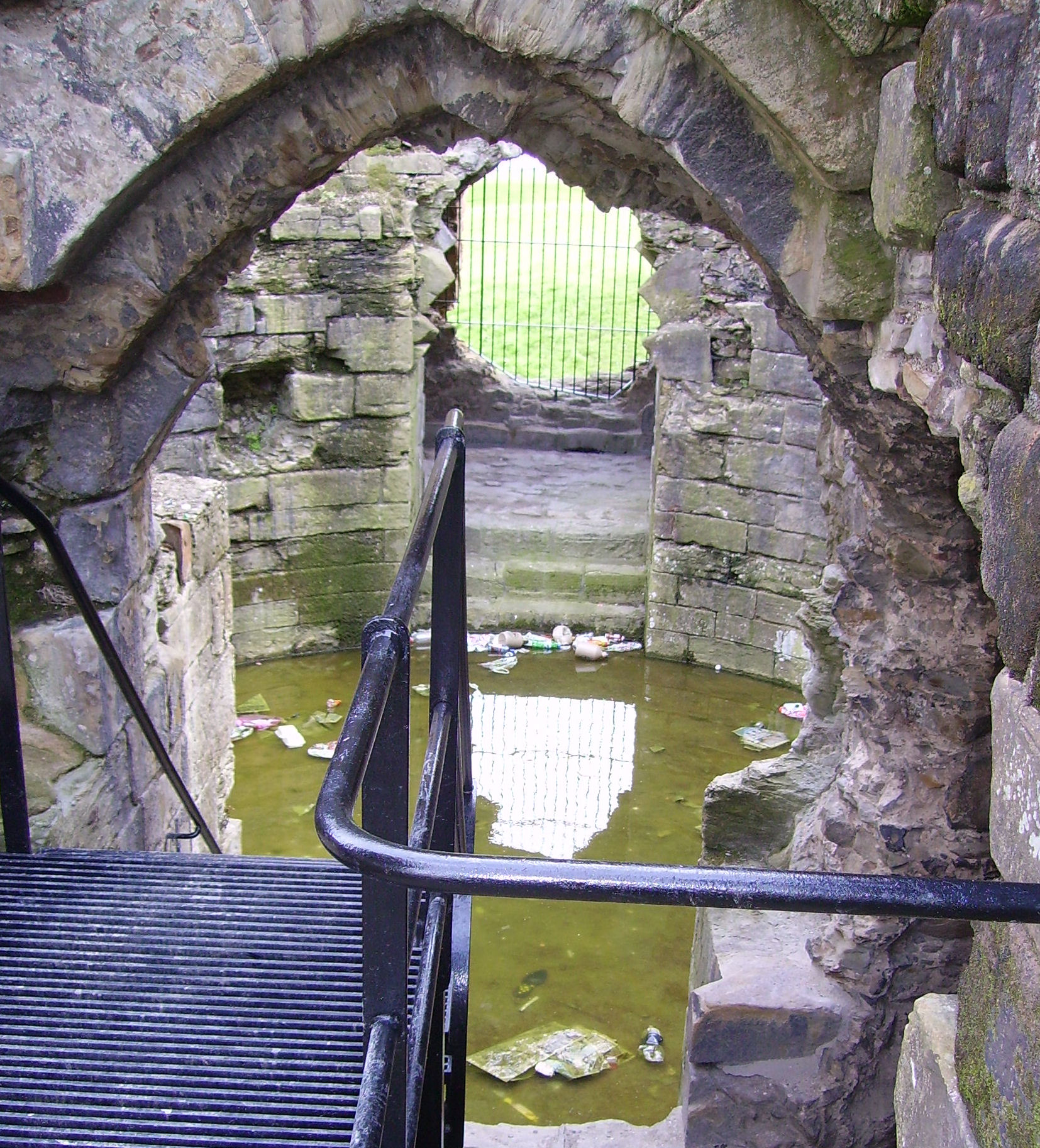
Looking down into the basement of the isolated keep. Part of the vaulted passageway can be seen in the far stairwell.

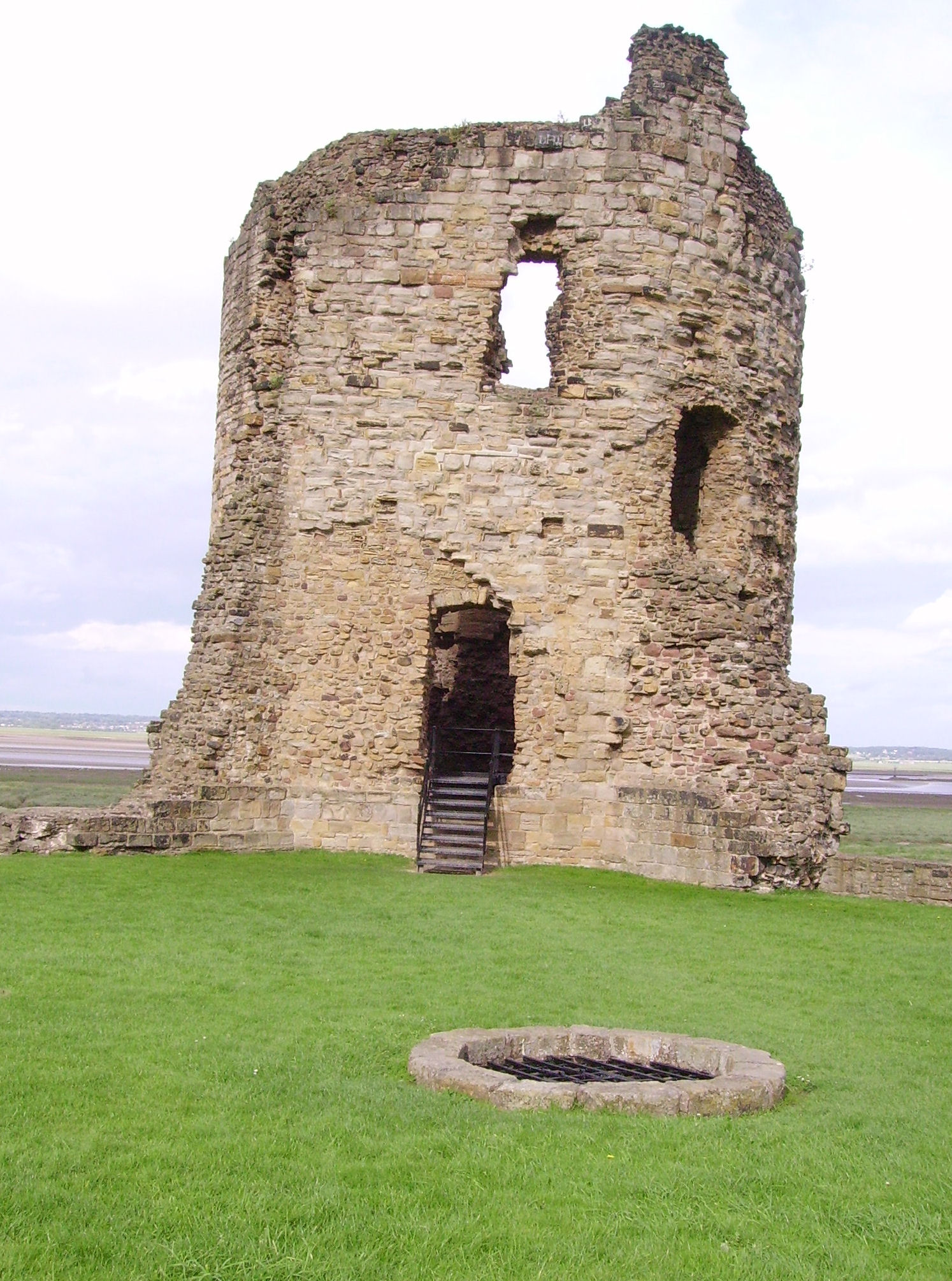
The castle well and a corner tower with some of its original ashlar cladding.

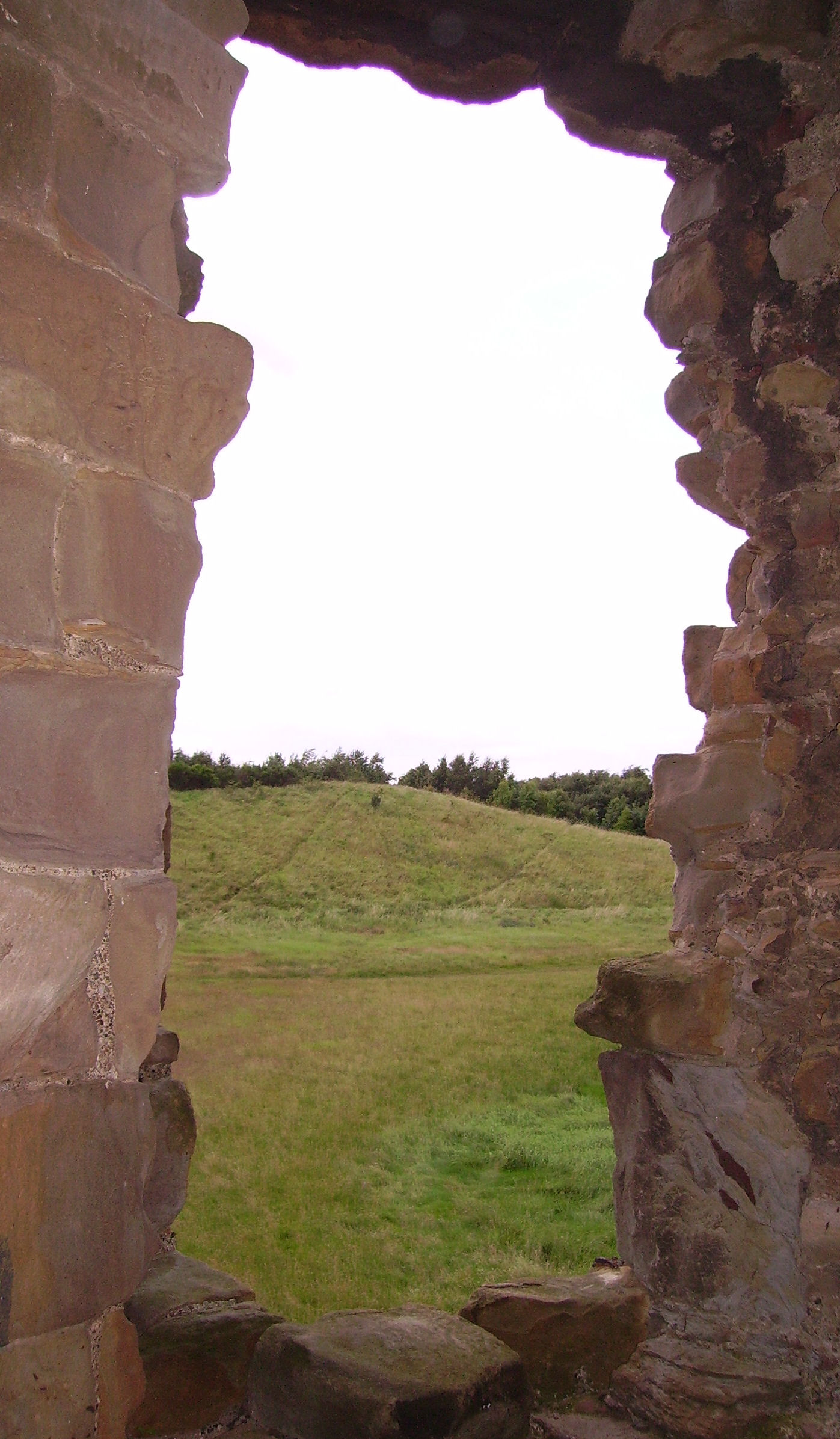
A degraded arrow slit that once defended the north side of the castle.

== See also ==
- Rhuddlan Castle
- List of castles in Wales
