= Saint-Georges-d'Espéranche =

- Commune
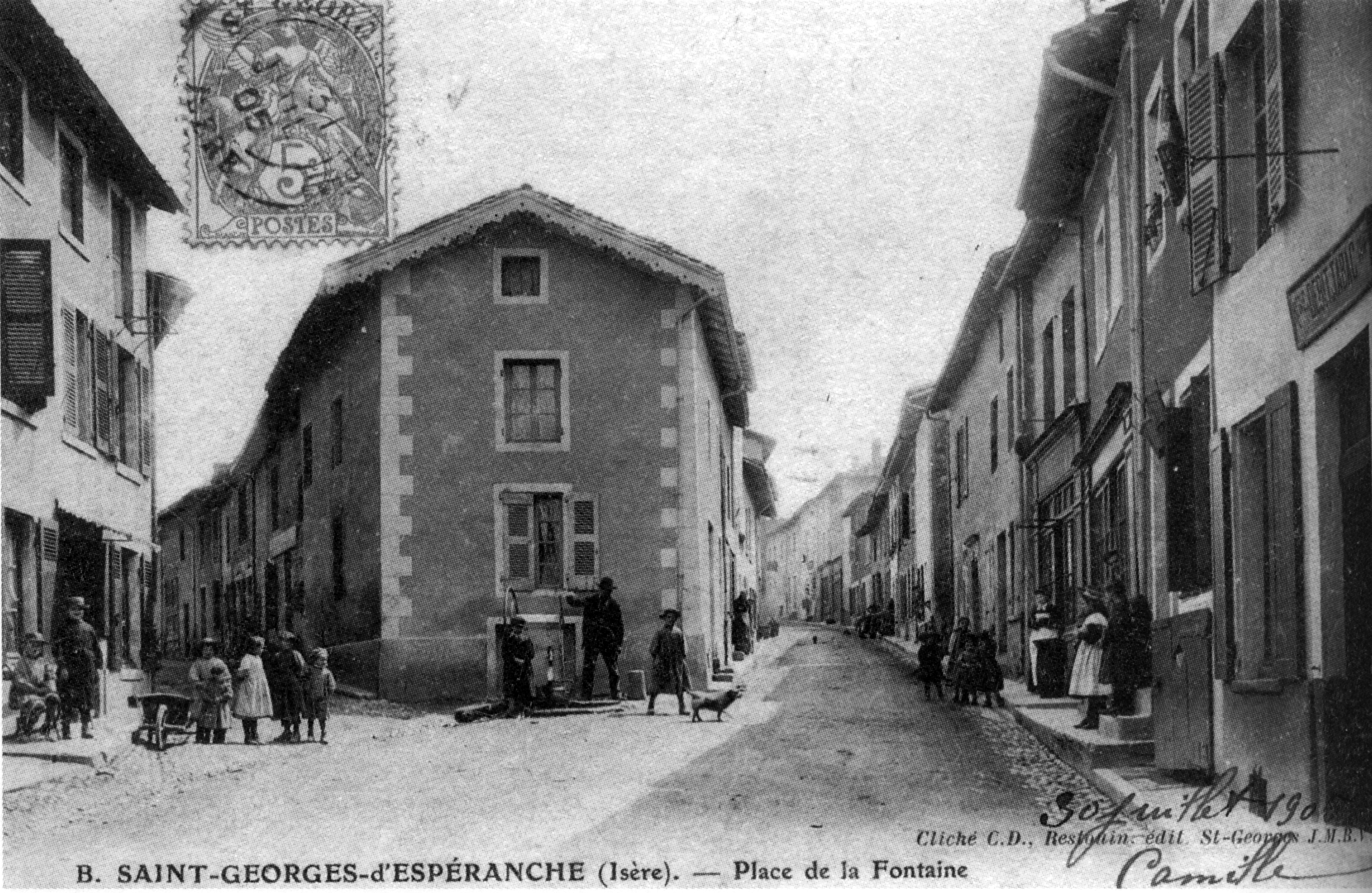
- Saint-Georges-d'Espéranche in 1905

- Coat of arms
- Location of Saint-Georges-d'Espéranche
- Location within France Location within Auvergne-Rhône-Alpes
- Coordinates: 45°33′24″N 5°04′42″E
- Country: France
- Region: Auvergne-Rhône-Alpes
- Department: Isère
- Arrondissement: Vienne
- Canton: La Verpillière
- Intercommunality: Collines Isère Nord Communauté

Government
  - Mayor (2020–2026): Brigitte Groix
- Area^{1}: 24.65 km^{2} (9.52 sq mi)
- Highest elevation: 460 m (1,510 ft)
- Lowest elevation: 270 m (890 ft)
- Population (2023): 3,545
  - Density: 143.8/km^{2} (372.5/sq mi)
- Time zone: UTC+01:00 (CET)
  - Summer (DST): UTC+02:00 (CEST)
- INSEE/Postal code: 38389 /38790
- ^{1} French Land Register data, which excludes lakes, ponds, glaciers > 1 km^{2} (0.386 sq mi or 247 acres) and river estuaries.

Saint-Georges-d'Espéranche (French pronunciation: [sɛ̃ ʒɔʁʒ dɛspeʁɑ̃ʃ]) is a commune in the Isère department in southeastern France.

== History ==
The medieval architect and castle builder for Edward I of England, Master James of Saint George, also known as Jacques de Saint-Georges d'Espéranche, constructed the castle for Philip I, Count of Savoy. On 23 June 1273 he met King Edward I of England there, and it is likely the castle inspired the later construction of the UNESCO listed castles of north Wales.

== Population ==
Historical population

Year	Pop.	±% p.a.
1793	1,600	—
1821	1,895	+0.61%
1846	2,403	+0.95%
1872	2,226	−0.29%
1901	1,671	−0.98%
1926	1,336	−0.89%
1946	1,272	−0.25%
1962	1,369	+0.46%
1968	1,411	+0.50%

Year	Pop.	±% p.a.
1975	1,589	+1.71%
1982	1,981	+3.20%
1990	2,221	+1.44%
1999	2,840	+2.77%
2007	3,015	+0.75%
2012	3,244	+1.47%
2017	3,354	+0.67%
2023	3,545	+0.93%

Source: EHESS and INSEE (1968-2023)

== See also ==
- Communes of the Isère department
