= Château de Dourdan =

Castle in Dourdan, Essonne, France

Coordinates: 48°31′48″N 2°0′39″E

- Part of the Department of Essonne
- Dourdan, France
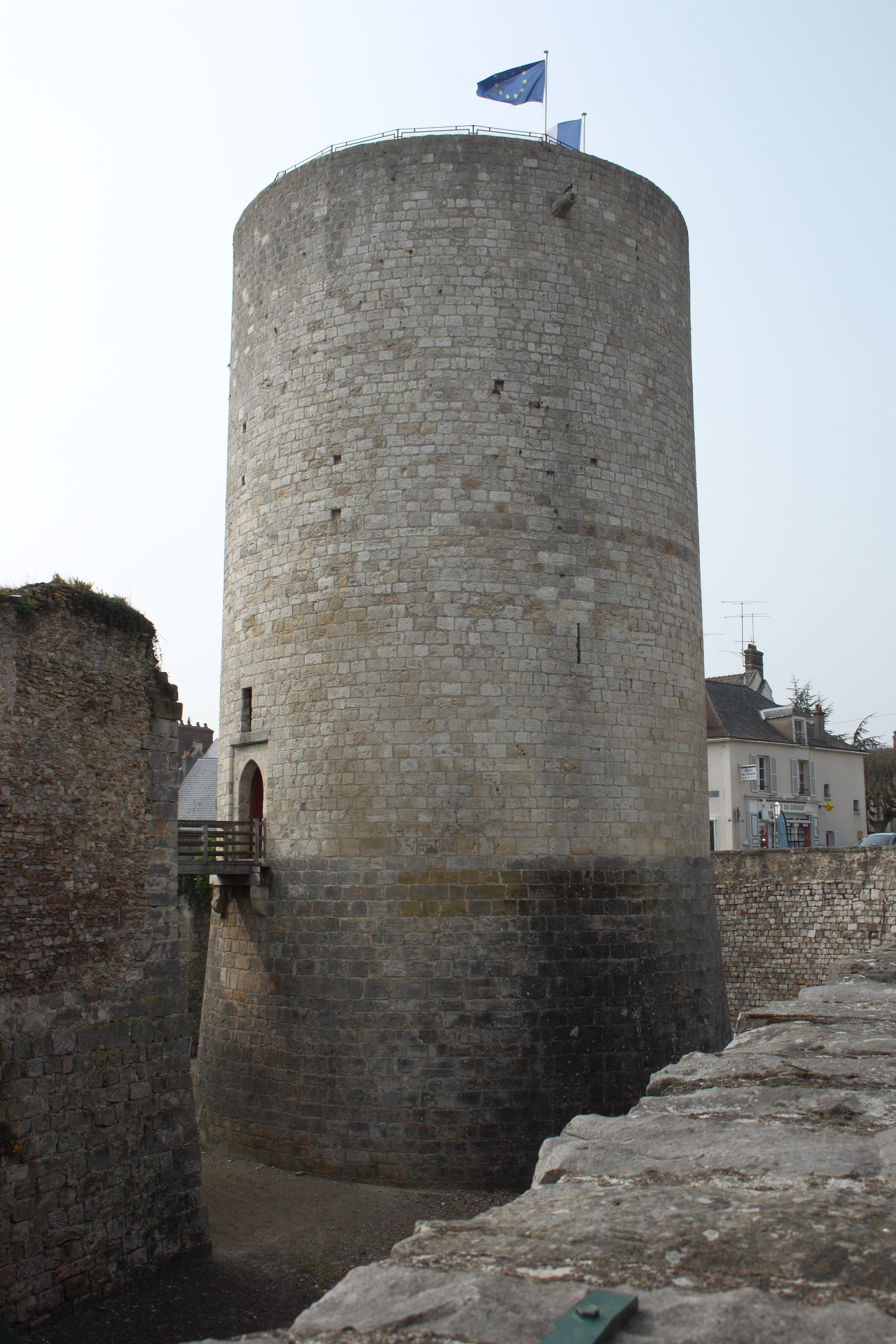
- The donjon is separated from the castle by a dry moat.

Site information
- Open to the public: Yes
- Condition: Preserved

Location

Site history
- Built: 1220s
- Built by: Philip II Augustus of France
- In use: museum
- Materials: Limestone
- Events: French Wars of Religion

The Château de Dourdan is a castle in the town of Dourdan in the Essonne department of France.

== Construction ==
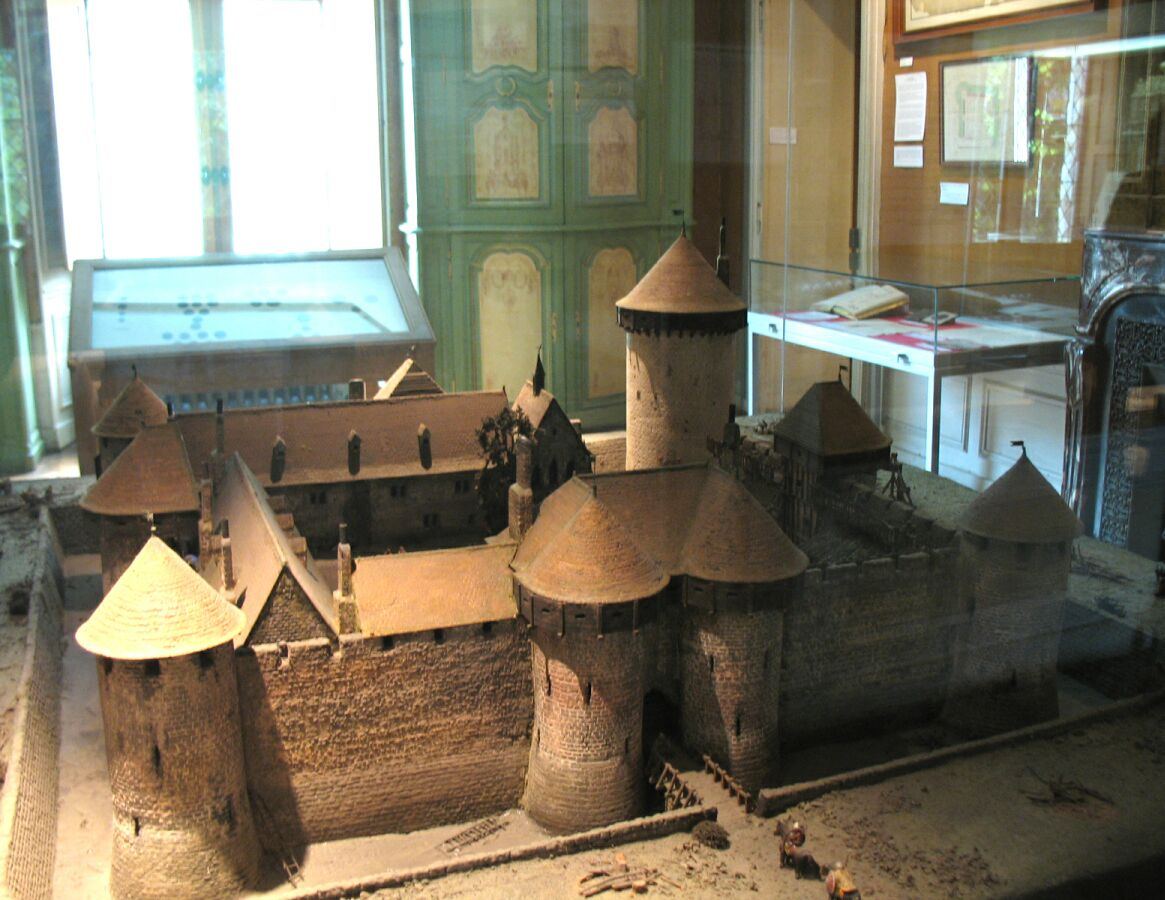
A model of the Château de Dourdan when first built, as can be seen at the castle museum

The fortification is characteristic of the military architecture of this period. It is built on a square pattern, with towers at three of the corners and an isolated donjon at the fourth. The walls are punctuated by towers in the middle of each side, and two, on the east side, flank the gatehouse. A deep stone-lined dry moat follows the outline of the castle.

The donjon, the major defensive component of the castle, measures approximately 30 metres in height and 13.6 metres in diameter. It is typical of the donjons being built by King Philip II Augustus of France at this time, like at Rouen and other French nobility throughout the 13th century.

The conception of the geometric pattern and isolated donjon was similar to that of the castle of the Louvre. A near identical castle is found at Seringes-et-Nesles, department of Aisne in northern France.

The principle of the isolated keep was also employed at Flint Castle in Wales and Yverdon Castle in Switzerland, fortification begun by a Gascon master mason in the late 13th century.

== History ==
The châtellenie of Dourdan was part of the Crown lands of France (Domaine royal) from the 10th century. The present fortress was built at the request of Philip Augustus in the 1220s in the place of a wood structure.

The castle became the property of Jean de Berry in 1385. It was besieged during the French Wars of Religion. Among some of the notable personages who resided in the castle were Philip IV of France's daughter-in-law, Joan II, Countess of Burgundy, detained there from 1314 to 1315 in relation to the Tour de Nesle affair, and La Hire, one of Joan of Arc's comrades-in-arms.

At the end of the 17th century, the Château de Dourdan was given to the Duke of Orléans who turned it into a prison. The donjon was used as a prison until 1852. It now houses a museum of local history.

== Gallery ==
Outline plan of the castle with its isolated keep.

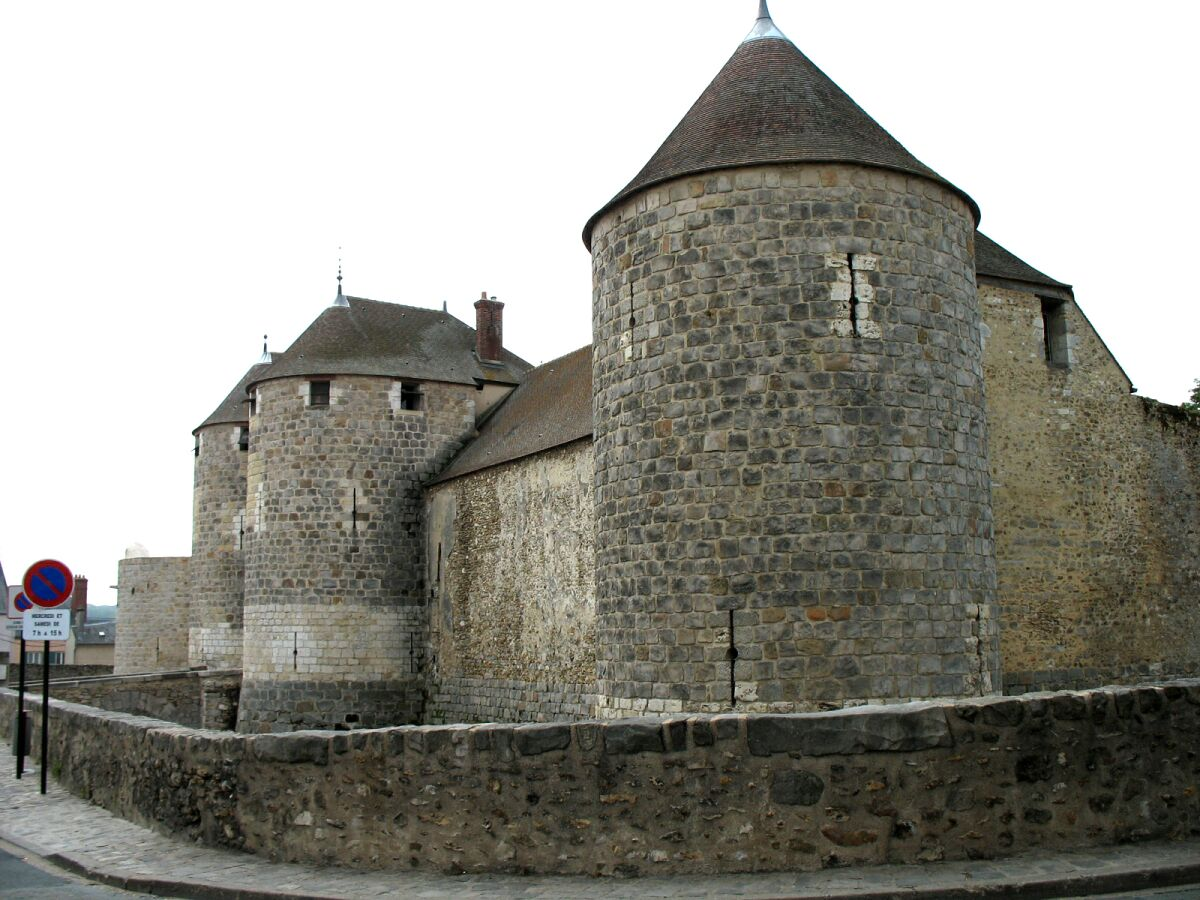
The walls around the castle of Dourdan.

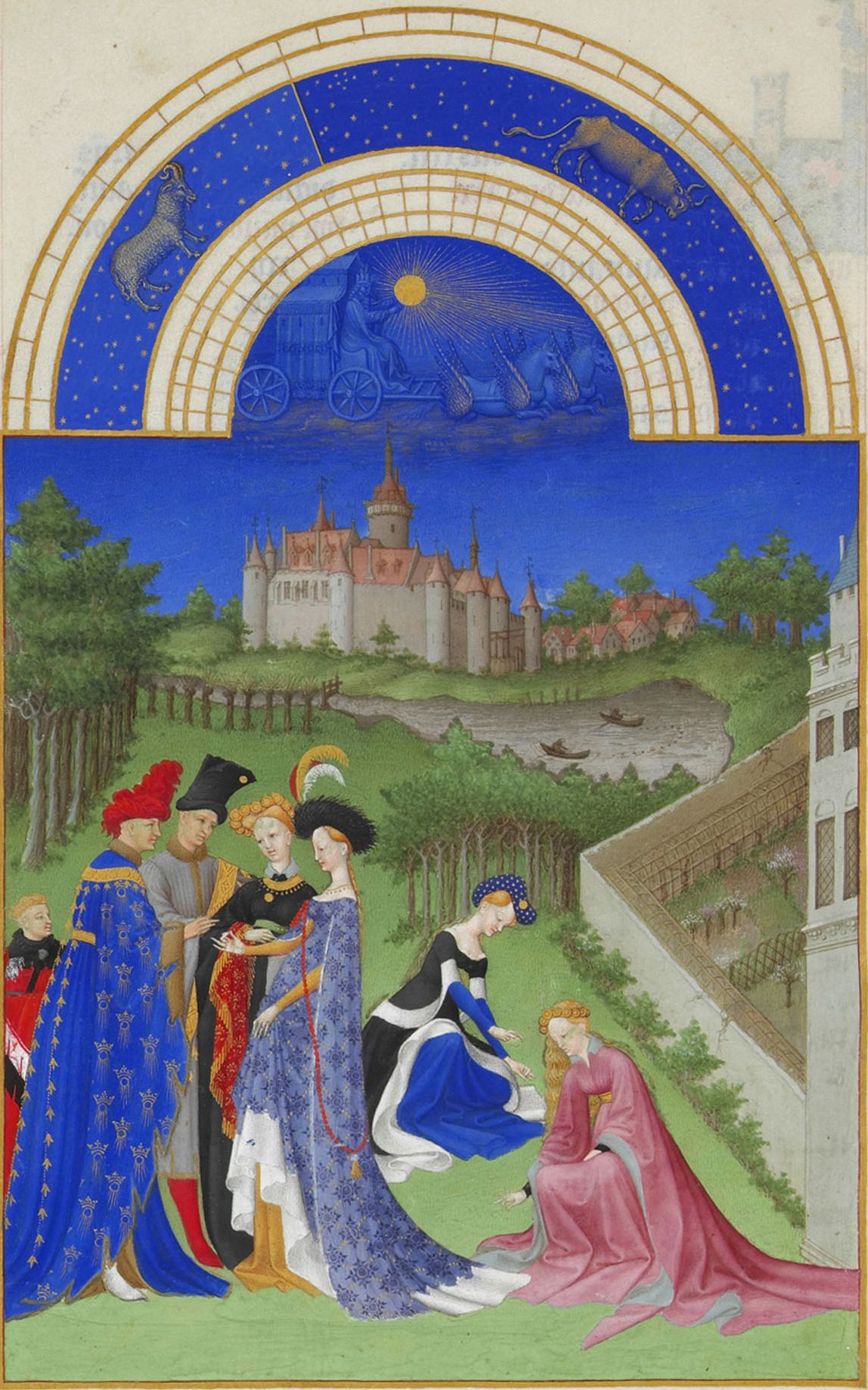
An illuminated page from the Très Riches Heures du Duc de Berry, the month of April, featuring an image of the Château de Dourdan c. 1400.

== See also ==
- List of castles in France
