= Yverdon-les-Bains Castle =

Castle in Yverdon-les-Bains, Switzerland

- Château d'Yverdon
- Yverdon-les-Bains in Switzerland
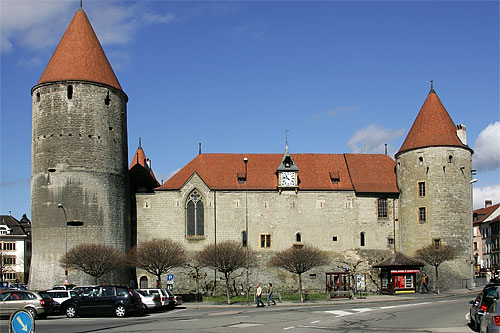
- Château d'Yverdon

Site information
- Type: Castle
- Owner: Commune d'Yverdon-les-Bains
- Condition: Museum

Location
- Location within Canton of Vaud Location within Switzerland
- Coordinates: 46°46′42″N 6°38′30″E

Site history
- Built: 13th century
- Built by: Jacques de Saint-Georges

Garrison information
- Occupants: Yverdon regional museum

Swiss Cultural Property of National Significance

Yverdon-les-Bains Castle is a castle in the municipality of Yverdon-les-Bains of the Canton of Vaud in Switzerland. It is a Swiss heritage site of national significance.

== History ==
In 1260 Peter II, Count of Savoy acquired the rights to what became the site of the town and castle of Yverdon. Peter had previously been responsible for the building of walls and towers at Pevensey Castle in Sussex, England and wasted no time in building a new castle at Yverdon. He appointed a Master John and his son Master James to build the castle that remains to this day.

The imposing main walls and their four towers follow the geometric characteristics used for lowland castles. It was planned out by the young mason and architect James of St. George as apprentice to his father Master John. He would later travel to England where he would become the master castle builder for King Edward I. James would be responsible for building a series of castles (known as the "Iron Ring") in North Wales following its conquest by the English Crown. As such the castle is the first known work of the architect later responsible for what historian Marc Morris called "the most magnificent chain of castles ever created".

Yverdon's castle used to be the residence of the castellans of the Savoy dynasty, until 1536, followed by the bailiffs of Bern state. In 1798, the Département du Léman became the castle's owner. The Département had been set up by the short-lived Helvetic Republic (1798–1803), imposed by Napoleon I.

A few years later, Yverdon acquired the castle, to entrust it to Johann Heinrich Pestalozzi and his institute. After 1838, the castle housed a public school. New classrooms were created, especially on the second floor: dividing walls were erected, additional windows changed the severe look of the castle's façade. After 1950, these classrooms were gradually abandoned; the last classes left in 1974. The original medieval structure was then restored. The castle is today a multi-purpose cultural centre, housing a regional museum, a theatre, various conference rooms and the oldest public library of French-speaking Switzerland, founded already in 1763. The library is now part of the castle museum, existing since 1830.

== See also ==
- List of castles in Switzerland
- Château
