= Marc Morris (historian) =

British historian (born 1973)

- Born: 14 September 1973 (age 53)

Academic background
- Education: King's College London; University of Oxford
- Thesis: The Bigod earls of Norfolk in the thirteenth century (2004)

Marc Morris (born 1973) is a British-Irish historian, who has also presented a television series, Castle, on Channel 4 in the United Kingdom, and wrote the book that accompanied the series. His 2005 book on the earls of the Bigod family was praised for its "impeccable research and fluent sense of narration".

Morris was educated at Oakwood Park Grammar School, King's College London and the University of Oxford. At Oxford, he was a student of the Faculty of Modern History and Merton College, Oxford. His Doctor of Philosophy (DPhil) degree was awarded in 2004 for a doctoral thesis title "The Bigod earls of Norfolk in the thirteenth century".

== Bibliography ==
- Castle: A History of the Buildings that Shaped Medieval Britain (2003). ISBN 978-0-330-43246-7.
- The Bigod Earls of Norfolk in the Thirteenth Century (2005)
- A Great and Terrible King: Edward I and the Forging of Britain (2008). ISBN 978-0-09-179684-6.
- The Norman Conquest: The Battle of Hastings and the Fall of Anglo-Saxon England (2012). ISBN 978-1-4481-3602-5.
- Kings and Castles (2012)
- King John: Treachery, Tyranny and the Road to Magna Carta (2015)
- William I: England's Conqueror (2016)
- Morris, Marc (25 May 2021). The Anglo-Saxons: A History of the Beginnings of England: 400 – 1066. Simon and Schuster. ISBN 978-1-64313-535-9.
