= A. J. Taylor =

English historian (1911–2002)

Arnold Joseph Taylor (1911–2002) was a medieval historian who was an international expert on European castle building. He was a leading expert on the Welsh castles of Edward I, identifying the origins of the architect in Savoy (now in Switzerland). He was Chief Inspector of Ancient Monuments and Historic Buildings at the Ministry of Works (later the Ministry of Public Building and Works and the Department of the Environment) from 1961 to 1972.

Arnold Joseph Taylor was born in London on 24 July 1911. He was educated at the Merchant Taylors' School and at St. John's College, Oxford, where he read history. After obtaining a diploma in education he became a schoolteacher at Chard School in Somerset.

In 1935 he joined the Ministry of Works as Assistant Inspector in the Ancient Monuments office. After wartime service in RAF Intelligence he was appointed Inspector of Ancient Monuments for Wales, with responsibility for the Edwardian castles of North Wales, on which he became an expert. In 1953 he wrote Caernarvon Castle and Town Walls, which served as the Official Guide-Book for that important structure; it was issued by the Ministry of Public Building and Works. (The book was reissued in 1964 with revisions). He was promoted to Assistant Chief Inspector in 1954 and to Chief Inspector in 1961, which he remained until retirement in 1972.

In 1940 Taylor married Patricia Guilbride; they had one son and one daughter. He died in Compton, Surrey on 24 October 2002, aged 91.

== Awards and public appointments ==
- Freeman of the City of London (1959)
- CBE (1971)
- Fellow of the British Academy (1972)
- Society of Antiquaries; president 1975–78
- London and Middlesex Archaeological Society, president 1971–73
