= Lists of tourist attractions in Switzerland =

This article contains lists of tourist attractions in Switzerland.

== Cultural ==
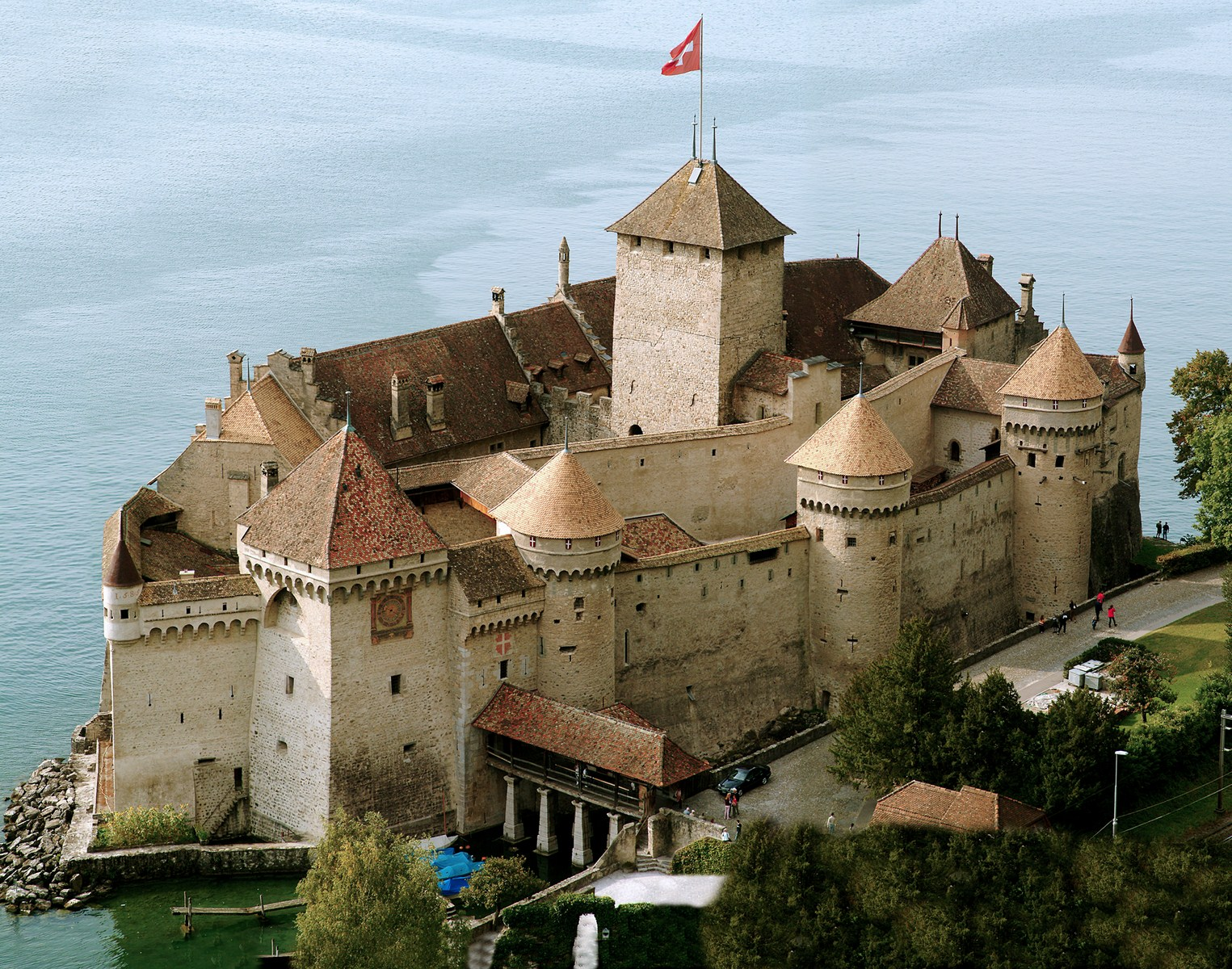
Chillon Castle, Lake Geneva

=== Buildings ===
- List of bridges in Switzerland
- List of castles and fortresses in Switzerland
- List of cathedrals in Switzerland
- List of Christian monasteries in Switzerland
- List of lighthouses in Switzerland
- List of Roman sites in Switzerland
- List of synagogues in Switzerland
- Swiss Inventory of Cultural Property of National and Regional Significance (list of monuments)

=== Transport ===
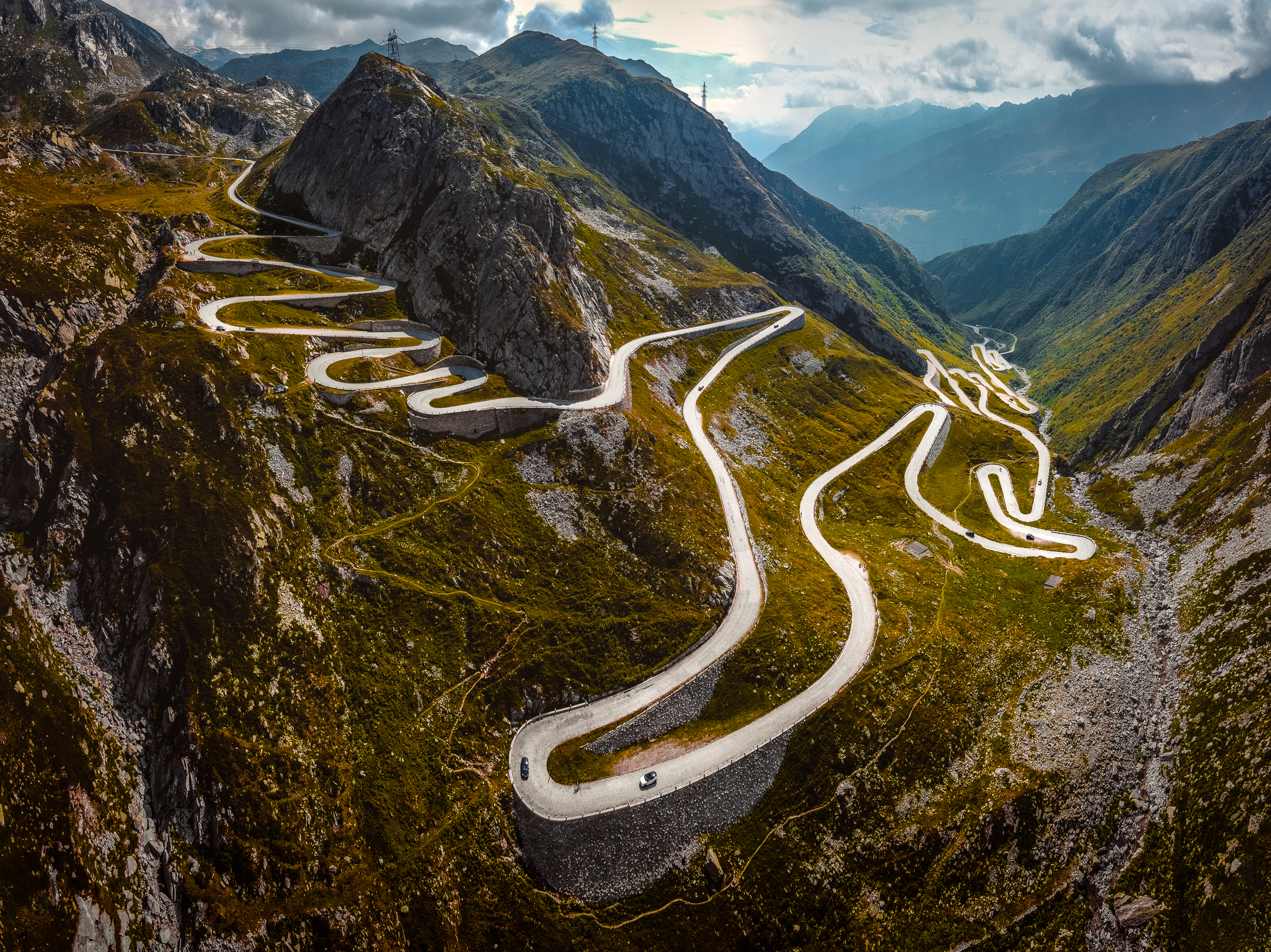
Scenic Tremola road of the Gotthard Pass

- List of aerial tramways in Switzerland
- List of funiculars in Switzerland
- List of heritage railways and funiculars in Switzerland
- List of highest paved roads in Switzerland
- List of highest railway stations in Switzerland
- List of highest road passes in Switzerland
- List of mountain railways in Switzerland
- List of railway museums in Switzerland
- Panorama Express (tourism-focused trains)
- Swiss National Bike Routes

=== Other ===
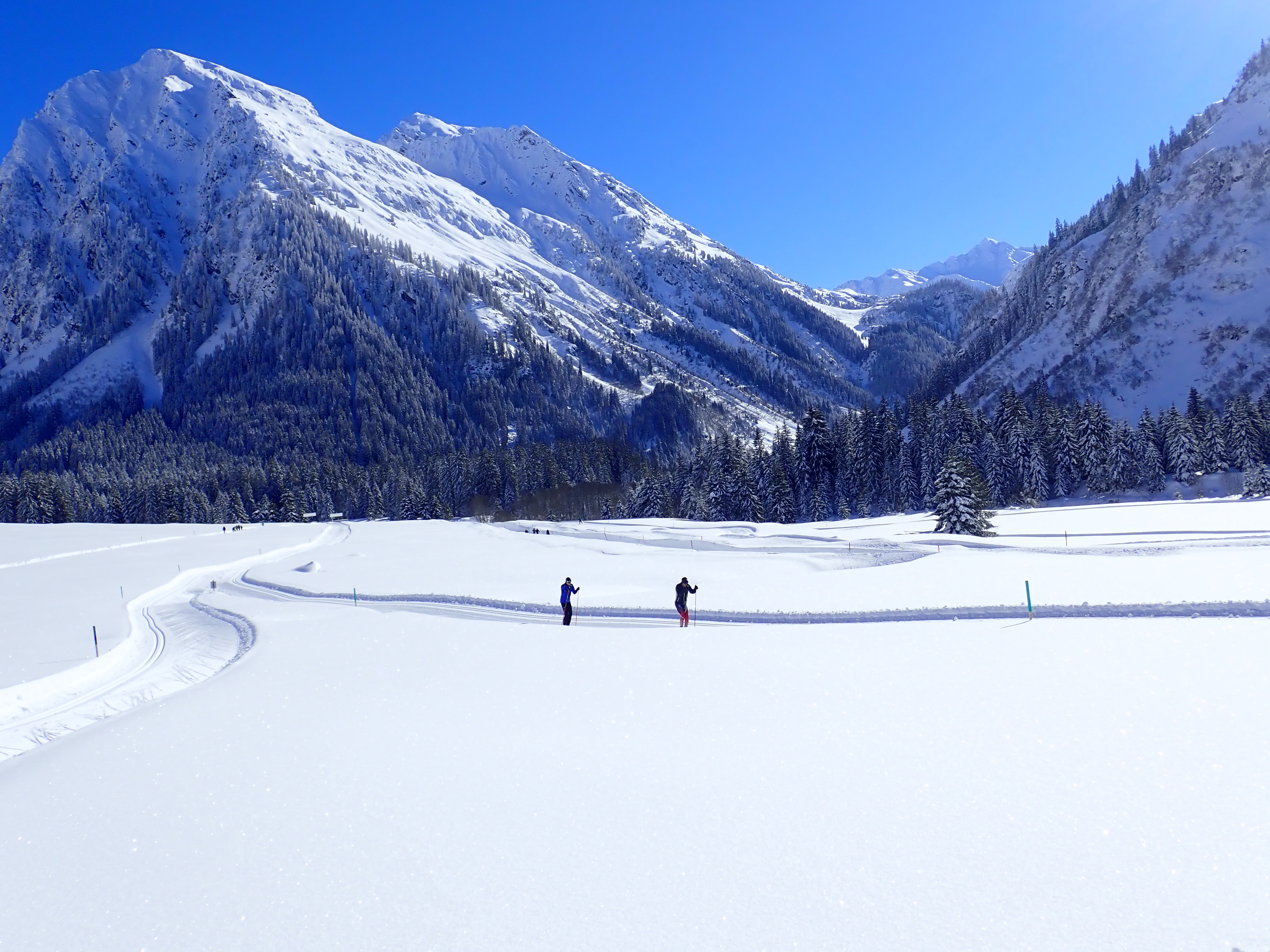
Cross-country skiing near Klosters

- List of botanical gardens in Switzerland
- List of cross-country skiing trails in Switzerland
- List of federal hunting reserves in Switzerland
- List of museums in Switzerland
- List of restaurants in Switzerland
- List of shopping streets and districts in Switzerland
- List of ski areas and resorts in Switzerland
- List of World Heritage Sites in Switzerland
- List of zoos in Switzerland

== Natural ==
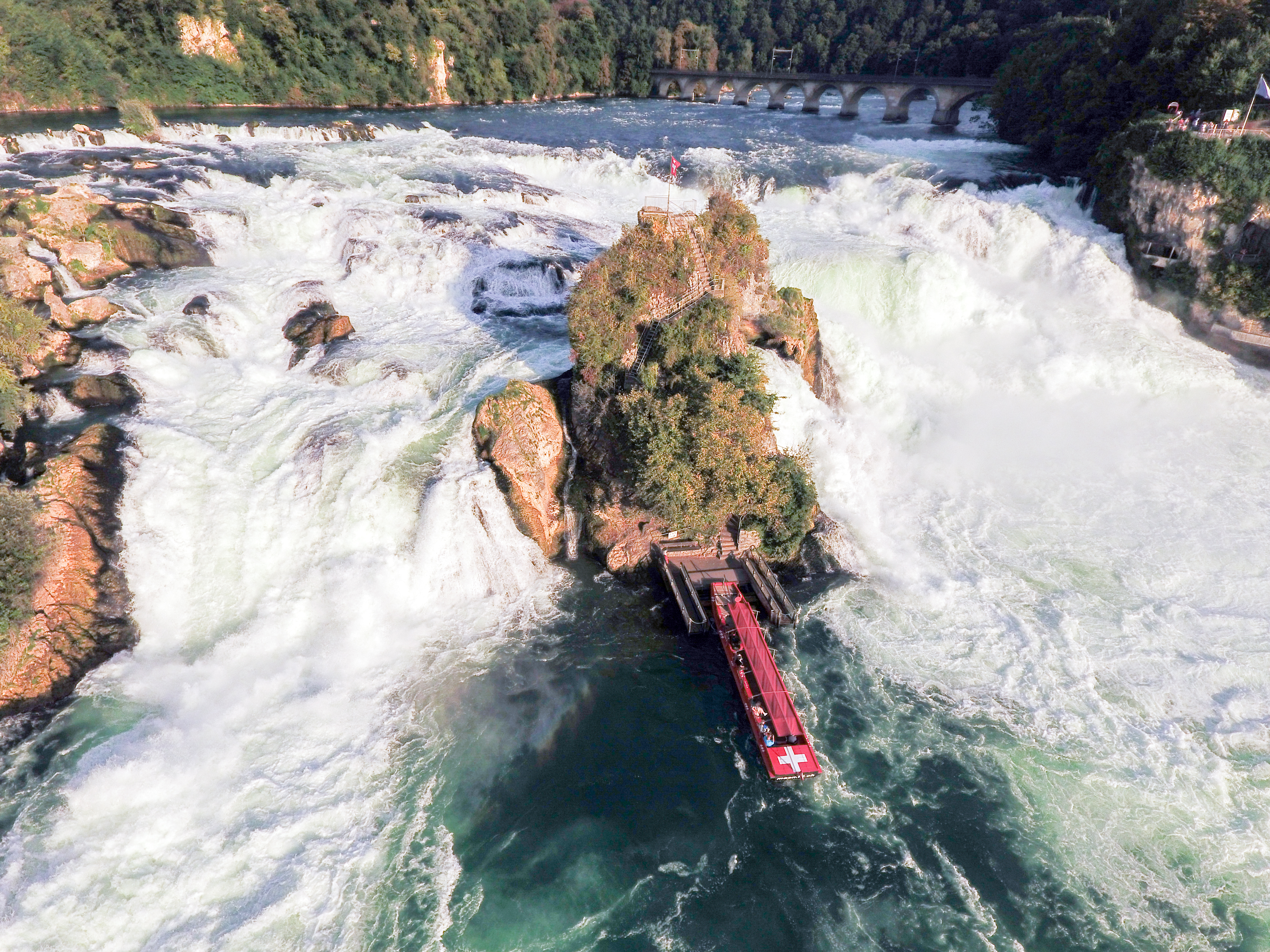
Rhine Falls, Europe's largest waterfall

- List of canyons in Switzerland
- List of caves in Switzerland
- List of glaciers in Switzerland
- List of islands of Switzerland
- List of lakes of Switzerland
- List of mire landscapes in Switzerland
- List of mountain lakes of Switzerland
- List of mountains of Switzerland accessible by public transport
- List of prominent mountains of Switzerland
- List of waterfalls of Switzerland
- Nature parks in Switzerland

== See also ==
- List of cities in Switzerland
- Tourism in Switzerland
