= List of World Heritage Sites in Switzerland =

Location of World Heritage Sites within Switzerland. The green dots indicate the pile dwellings sites, 56 in total.

The United Nations Educational, Scientific and Cultural Organization (UNESCO) designates World Heritage Sites of outstanding universal value to cultural or natural heritage which have been nominated by countries which are signatories to the UNESCO World Heritage Convention, established in 1972. Cultural heritage consists of monuments (such as architectural works, monumental sculptures, or inscriptions), groups of buildings, and sites (including archaeological sites). Natural heritage consists of natural features (physical and biological formations), geological and physiographical formations (including habitats of threatened species of animals and plants), and natural sites which are important from the point of view of science, conservation, or natural beauty. Switzerland ratified the convention on 17 September 1975, making its natural and cultural sites eligible for inclusion on the list.

As of 2021, there are thirteen properties in Switzerland inscribed on the World Heritage List, nine of which are cultural sites and four are natural sites. The first three sites were added to the list in 1983: Old City of Berne, Abbey of Saint Gall, and Benedictine Abbey of St. John at Müstair. The most recent addition were the two forests added to the Ancient and Primeval Beech Forests of the Carpathians and Other Regions of Europe site in 2021. Five sites are shared with other countries. The Rhaetian Railway and Monte San Giorgio are shared with Italy, Prehistoric pile dwellings around the Alps with five countries, The Architectural Work of Le Corbusier with six countries, and the Ancient and Primeval Beech Forests with 17 countries. There is one site on the tentative list.

== World Heritage Sites ==
UNESCO lists sites under ten criteria; each entry must meet at least one of the criteria. Criteria i through vi are cultural, and vii through x are natural.

* Transnational site

World Heritage Sites
Site	Image	Location (canton)	Year listed	UNESCO data	Description
Old City of Berne	Bern's old city as seen from across the Aare River	Bern	1983	267; iii (cultural)	Berne was founded in the 12th century on a hill site surrounded by the Aare River from three sides. Over centuries, the city developed following an exceptionally coherent planning concept, thus retaining its original character. The medieval city saw the introduction of water fountains in the 16th century and the renovation and rebuilding of older buildings in the 18th century.
Convent of St Gall	A large cathedral with two distinct summits	St. Gallen	1983	268; ii, iv (cultural)	The Carolingian Convent of St Gall was founded in the 8th century and was secularized in 1805. It was one of the most important monasteries in Europe. Its library is one of the richest and oldest in the world and contains a number of precious manuscripts, such as the Plan of Saint Gall. Portions of the building were rebuilt in the Baroque style in the 18th century.
Benedictine Convent of St John at Müstair	A clock tower standing beside two small houses and a museum	Grisons	1983	269; iii (cultural)	The Convent of Müstair is a Christian monastery from the Carolingian period, and was founded around 775. The church houses Switzerland's greatest series of figurative murals, painted in the first half of the 9th century. Some frescoes were painted over but restored in the 20th century. Since the 12th century, the convent has been used as a religious centre for Benedictine sisters.
Three Castles, Defensive Wall and Ramparts of the Market-Town of Bellinzona	Montebello and Sasso Corbaro castles above Bellinzona	Ticino	2000	884; iv (cultural)	The fortifications at Bellinzona protected the entrance to the Ticino valley and in turn the access to one of the most important Alpine passes, leading to north Italy. The bulk of the fortifications dates to the 15th century, though some parts are centuries older. The property comprises two castles, Castelgrande and Montebello, which are connected by walls, and a third castle, Sasso Corbaro, which was built on an isolated rocky promontory. The site is in an excellent state of conservation.
Swiss Alps Jungfrau-Aletsch	A glacier, mountains in the background	Bern and Valais	2001	1037bis; vii, viii, ix (natural)	This site encompasses one of the highest and most glaciated areas of the Alps, with peaks such as Eiger, Mönch, and Jungfrau. It provides a geomorphological record of the processes that shaped the High Alps, as well as a diverse habitat for animals and plants, developing in a succession following the retreat of the glaciers. The landscape has played an important role in the development of mountaineering and alpine tourism, as well as in literature and in arts. Originally listed in 2001, the boundaries of the site were expanded in 2007.
Monte San Giorgio*	Monte San Giorgio, shown on the left in the background of Lake Lugano	Ticino	2003	1090; viii (natural)	Monte San Giorgio, overlooking Lake Lugano, is regarded as the best fossil record of marine life from the Triassic Period (245–230 million years ago). In that period, the area was a tropical lagoon, flourishing with reptiles, fish, bivalves, ammonites, echinoderms, and crustaceans. Fossils of terrestrial animals are also preserved, as the lagoon was near the land. The part of the property in Switzerland was listed in 2003 and expanded to include the Italian part in 2010.
Lavaux, Vineyard Terraces	Vineyard terraces rise above Lake Geneva	Vaud	2007	1243; iii, iv, v (cultural)	The Vineyard Terraces at Lavaux stretch for about 30 km (19 mi) along the south-facing northern shores of Lake Geneva from Chillon Castle to the eastern outskirts of Lausanne. They date back to the 11th century, when the area was controlled by Benedictine and Cistercian monasteries. Wine has been important for the local economy throughout centuries. The protected area includes villages, individual buildings, roads, and footpaths.
Rhaetian Railway in the Albula / Bernina Landscapes*	The Glacier Express train in the Albula Valley	Grisons	2008	1276; ii, iv (cultural)	The Albula and Bernina lines of the Rhaetian Railway are two historic railway lines that cross the Swiss Alps. They were built in the early 20th century, providing a rapid and easy route into many formerly isolated alpine settlements. Building the railroads required overcoming technical challenges with bridges, galleries, and tunnels. The site is shared with Italy.
Swiss Tectonic Arena Sardona	Martinsloch (Martins hole) is visible in the center of the Tschingelhörner in the Glarus Alps	Grisons, Glarus, St. Gallen	2008	1179; viii (natural)	The Glarus Alps feature a major thrust fault, a geological phenomenon where older rocks are carried onto younger layers in the process of mountain building. As this area is well accessible, it has played an important role in the studies of tectonic processes and geological sciences since the 18th century.
La Chaux-de-Fonds / Le Locle, Watchmaking Town Planning	A fairly large city with buildings of diverse sizes	Neuchâtel	2009	1302; iv (cultural)	The two towns are located in the remote Swiss Jura Mountains. Due to poor agricultural land, the towns focused on watchmaking. After devastating fires in the 19th century, both towns were rebuilt to support this single industry. Artisanal production of a cottage industry developed into factory industry of the late 19th and 20th centuries. The town of La Chaux-de-Fonds, with its division of labour in the watchmaking industry, was studied by Karl Marx as a "huge factory-town" in his book Das Kapital.
Prehistoric pile dwellings around the Alps*	Remains of underwater palafittes, station of Morges	56 locations	2011	1363; iv, v (cultural)	This transnational site (shared with Austria, France, Germany, Italy, and Slovenia) contains 111 small individual sites with the remains of prehistoric pile-dwelling (or stilt house) settlements in and around the Alps built from around 5000 to 500 BCE on the edges of lakes, rivers, or wetlands. They contain a wealth of information on life and trade in agrarian Neolithic and Bronze Age cultures in Alpine Europe. Fifty-six of the sites are located in Switzerland.
The Architectural Work of Le Corbusier, an Outstanding Contribution to the Modern Movement*	Immeuble Clarté building	Vaud, Geneva	2016	1321rev; i, ii, vi (cultural)	This transnational site (shared with Argentina, Belgium, France, Germany, India, and Japan) encompasses 17 works of Franco-Swiss architect Le Corbusier. Le Corbusier was an important representative of the Modernist movement, which introduced new architectural techniques to meet the needs of the changing society. Two sites are listed in Switzerland, Immeuble Clarté and Villa Le Lac.
Ancient and Primeval Beech Forests of the Carpathians and Other Regions of Europe*		Ticino, Solothurn	2017	1133quater; ix (natural)	Primeval Beech Forests of the Carpathians are used to study the spread of the beech tree (Fagus sylvatica) in the Northern Hemisphere across a variety of environments and the environment in the forest. The site was first listed in 2007 in Slovakia and Ukraine. It was extended in 2011, 2017, and 2021 to include forests in a total of 18 countries. Two forests in Switzerland were added to the list in 2021, Forêt de la Vallée de Lodano and Forêt de la Bettlachstock.

== Tentative list ==
In addition to the sites inscribed on the World Heritage list, member states can maintain a list of tentative sites that they may consider for nomination. Nominations for the World Heritage list are only accepted if the site has previously been listed on the tentative list. As of 2021, Switzerland had one site on its tentative list.

Tentative sites
Site	Image	Location (canton)	Year listed	UNESCO criteria	Description
Salginatobel Bridge	Salginatobel Bridge, photo from below	Grisons	2017	i, iv (cultural)	The reinforced concrete bridge, 132 metres (433 ft) long and spanning 93 metres (305 ft) over the Salgina gorge, was designed by Swiss civil engineer Robert Maillart (1872–1949) and was completed in 1930. The bridge is prominent due to the innovative use of new materials during the construction and elegant design.

== See also ==
- List of Intangible Cultural Heritage elements in Switzerland
- Swiss Inventory of Cultural Property of National and Regional Significance
- Lists of tourist attractions in Switzerland
