= List of federal hunting reserves in Switzerland =

This is a list of federal hunting reserves in Switzerland.

== Reserves ==
Reserve	Canton
Augstmatthorn	Bern
Combe-Grède	Bern
Kiental	Bern
Schwarzhorn	Bern
Tannhorn	Lucerne
Uri Rotstock	Uri
Fellital	Uri
Mythen	Schwyz
Silbern-Jägern-Bödmerenwald	Schwyz
Hahnen	Obwalden
Hutstock	Obwalden, Nidwalden
Kärpf	Glarus
Schilt	Glarus
Rauti-Tros	Glarus
Graue Hörner	St. Gallen
Säntis	Appenzell Innerrhoden, Appenzell Ausserrhoden
Bernina-Albris	Grisons
Beverin	Grisons
Campasc	Grisons
Piz Ela	Grisons
Trescolmen	Grisons
Pez Vial/Greina	Grisons
Campo Tencia	Ticino
Greina	Ticino
Dent de Lys	Fribourg
Hochmatt-Motélon	Fribourg
Creux-du-Van	Neuchâtel
Grand Muveran	Vaud
Les Bimis-Ciernes Picat	Vaud
Le Noirmont	Vaud
Pierreuse-Gummfluh	Vaud
Aletschwald	Valais
Alpjuhorn	Valais
Wilerhorn	Valais
Bietschhorn	Valais
Mauvoisin	Valais
Val Ferret/Combe de l’A	Valais
Haut de Cry/Derborence	Valais
Leukerbad	Valais
Turtmanntal	Valais
Dixence	Valais

== See also ==
- Nature parks in Switzerland
