= Cassandre Berdoz =

Watchman of Lausanne Cathedral

Guette de la Cathédrale Notre Dame de Lausanne
- Assumed; 19 August 2021–present
- Preceded by: Renato Häusler

Personal details
- Born: Lausanne, Vaud, Switzerland
- Education: University of Neuchâtel
- Occupation: event planner watchman

Cassandre Berdoz is a Swiss event organizer and the first woman to serve as Watchman of Lausanne Cathedral.

== Biography ==
Berdoz was born and raised in Lausanne.

While a student at the University of Neuchâtel, Berdoz wrote letters to Lausanne city officials requesting they consider hiring a woman for the Cathedral watchman. A few years later, when the recruitment process began for a new watchman, Berdoz applied. After two rounds of interviews and an audition, Berdoz was selected as watchman, becoming the first woman to ever hold the position. She assumed the role on 19 August 2021.

As Watchman of the Lausanne Cathedral, she is assigned to post three to five nights a month, keeping watch from the bell tower. On the nights of her post, from 10:00 PM to 2:00 AM, Bersoz stands at each corner of the tower and calls out: “C’est la guette, il a sonné vingt-deux heures!”

Berdoz also works in event management. She is a project manager for a communications agency, helping organize the annuel Nuit des Musées.
