= List of botanical gardens in Switzerland =

Botanical gardens in Switzerland have collections consisting entirely of Switzerland native and endemic species; most have a collection that include plants from around the world. There are botanical gardens and arboreta in all states and territories of Switzerland, most are administered by local governments, some are privately owned.

- Arboretum Zürich
- Botanical Garden of the University of Basel, Basel
- Berne Botanical Garden, Bern
- Alpine botanical garden, Champex
- Botanical Garden Schatzalp, Davos
- Botanical Garden of the University of Fribourg, Fribourg
- Geneva Botanical Garden
- Cantonal Botanical Museum and Gardens (Musée et jardins botaniques cantonaux), Lausanne
- Botanical Garden of the University and City of Neuchâtel, Neuchâtel
- Botanical Garden St. Gallen, St. Gallen
- Botanical Garden of Saint-Triphon, Saint-Triphon (Ollon)
- Chinese Garden, Zürich
- Old Botanical Garden, Zürich
- Schynige Platte Alpine Garden, Gündlischwand
- University Botanical Garden, Zürich
