= Lausanne Cathedral =

Cathedral in Lausanne, Switzerland

Cathedral of Our Lady of Lausanne
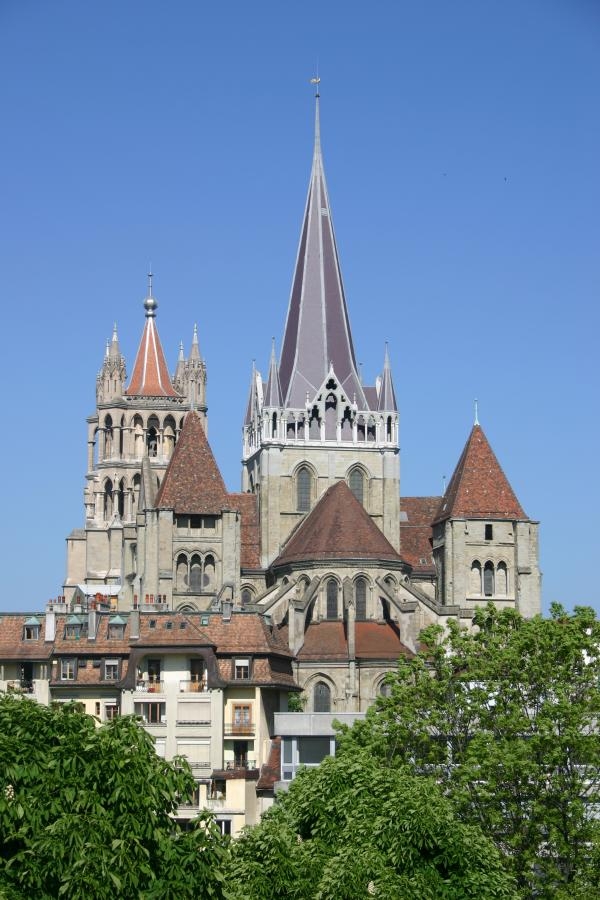
- The Cathedral of Our Lady in Lausanne
- Cathedral of Our Lady of Lausanne
- 46°31′21″N 06°38′08″E
- Location: Lausanne, Switzerland
- Denomination: Swiss Reformed
- Previous denomination: Roman Catholic
- Website: http://www.cathedrale-lausanne.ch

History
- Consecrated: 1275

Architecture
- Architect: Jean Cotereel
- Architectural type: church
- Style: Gothic
- Groundbreaking: 1170
- Completed: 1235

Specifications
- Length: 99.75 m

Administration
- District: Evangelical Reformed Church of the Canton of Vaud

The Cathedral of Our Lady of Lausanne (French: Cathédrale Notre-Dame de Lausanne), or simply Lausanne Cathedral, is a Swiss Reformed church located in the city of Lausanne, in the canton of Vaud, Switzerland. It is owned by the Evangelical Reformed Church of the Canton of Vaud.

== History ==
Construction of the cathedral began as early as 1170 by an original unknown master mason, for the use of the Catholic Church. Twenty years later, another master mason restarted construction until 1215. Finally a third engineer, Jean Cotereel, completed the majority of the existing cathedral including a porch, and two towers, one of which is the current day belfry. The other tower was never completed.

Pope Gregory X consecrated the cathedral to the Blessed Virgin Mary in 1275 attended by King Rudolph I of Germany and the former Bishop of Lausanne, Guillaume of Champvent. The medieval architect Villard de Honnecourt drew the rose window of the south transept in his sketchbook around 1220-1230.

The Protestant Reformation, in particular the variant which came from nearby Geneva, significantly affected the cathedral, with it eventually being turned over to a Protestant denomination. In 1536, a new liturgical area was added to the nave and the colourful decorations inside the cathedral were covered over. Other major restorations occurred later in the 18th and 19th century which were directed by the great French architect, Eugène Viollet-le-Duc. During the 20th century major restorations occurred to restore the painted interior decorations as well as to restore a painted portal on the South side of the cathedral. New organs were installed in 2003.

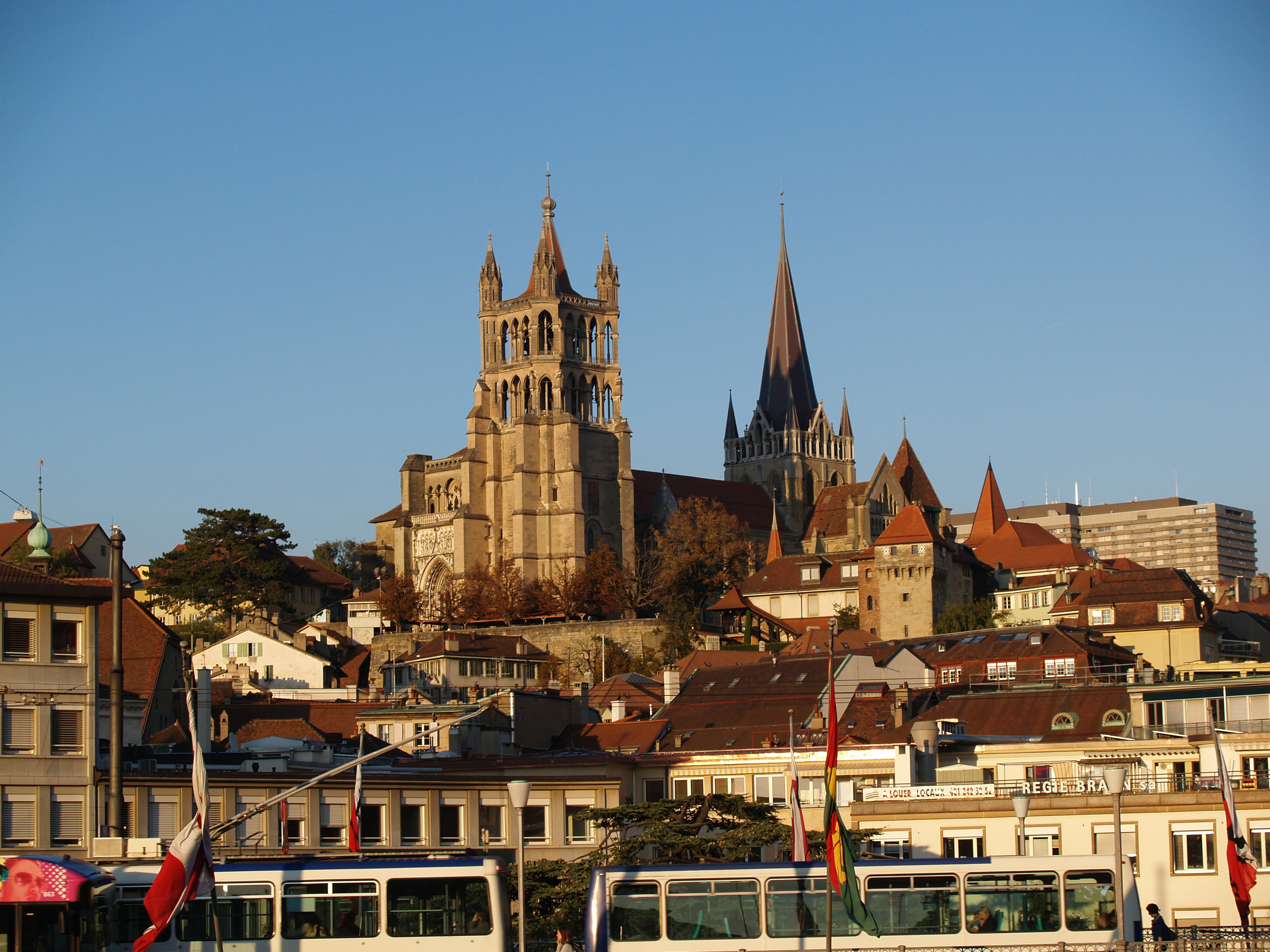
The cathedral, from Le Flon

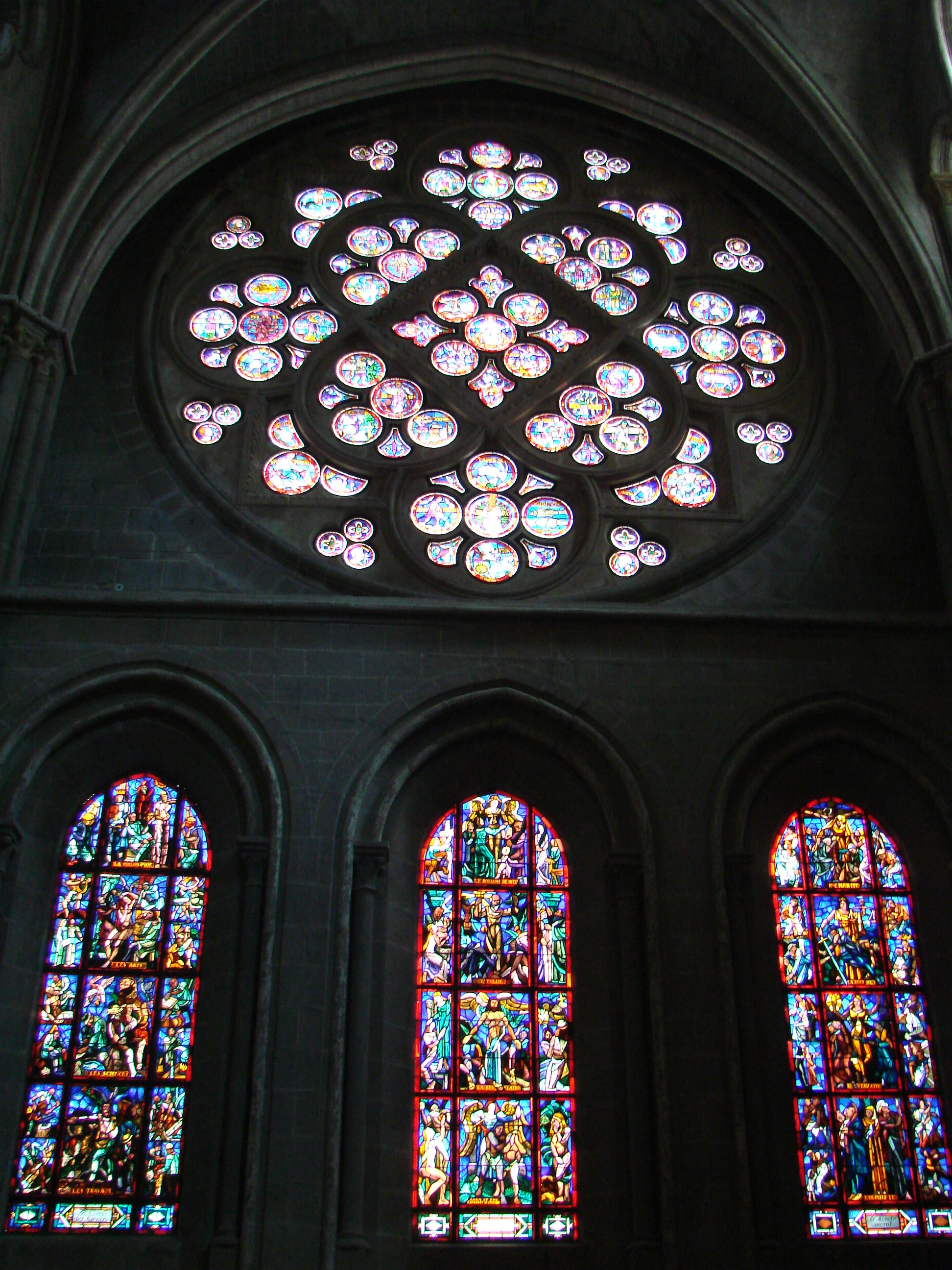
South rose window

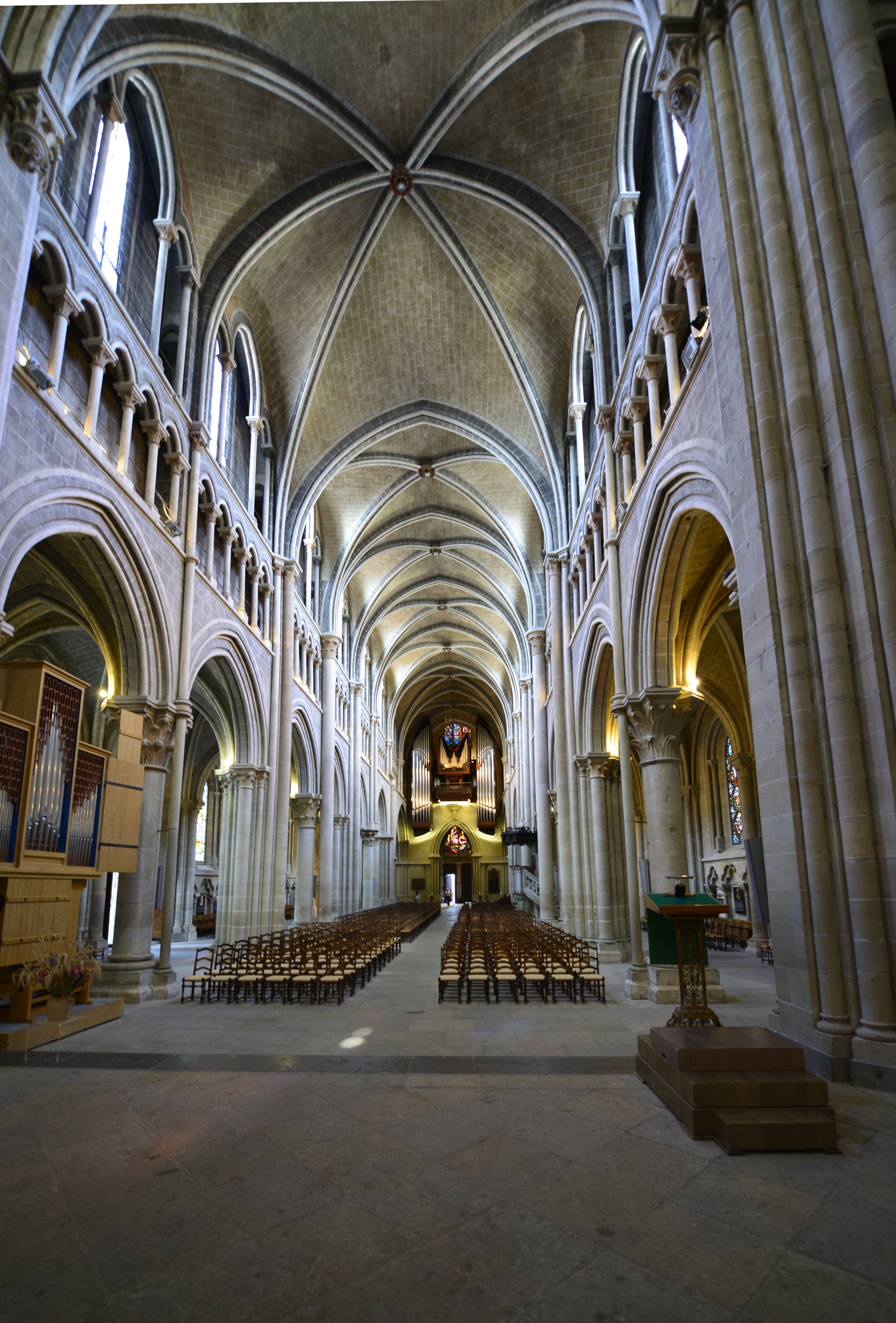
Inside, from the chancel

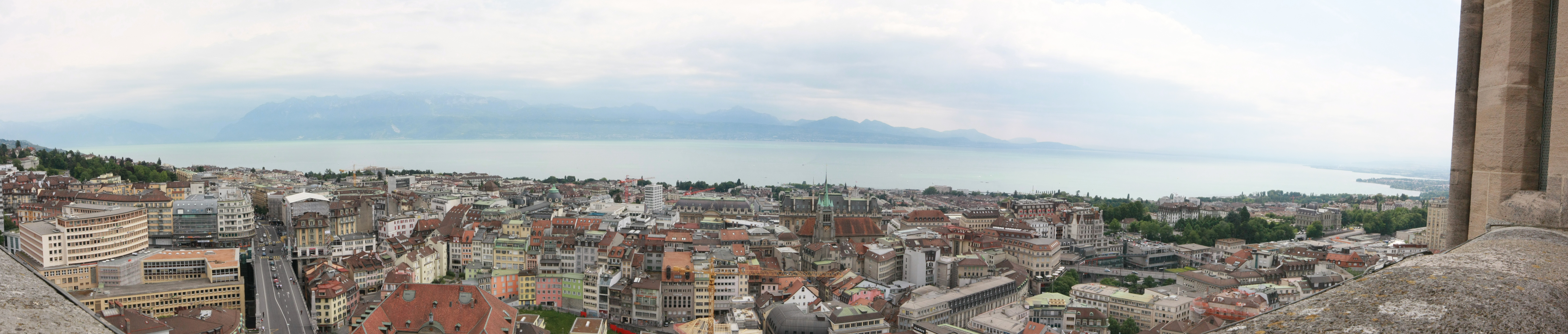
View from the tower

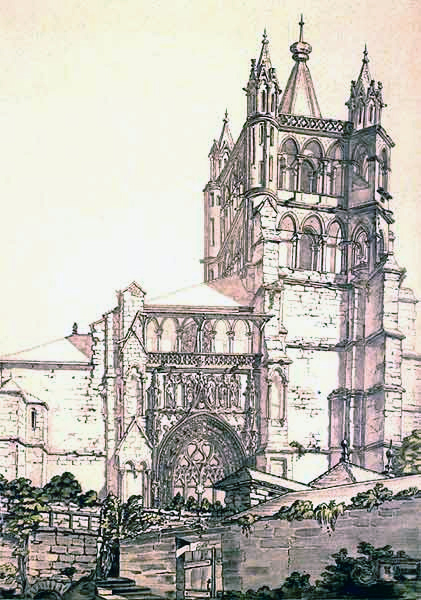
The cathedral in 1793

== Great organ ==
The great pipe organ of the Cathedral of Notre Dame of Lausanne was inaugurated in December 2003. It is a unique instrument in the world. It took ten years to design it and it is composed of 7000 pipes, two consoles, five manuals, and one pedalboard. It is the first organ to contain all four of the principal organ styles (Classical, French Symphonic, Baroque, German Romantic). It is also the first organ manufactured by an American organbuilder (Fisk) for a European cathedral. It cost a total of 6 million Swiss francs, took 150,000 man-hours to build and weighs 40 tons. It was preceded by a Kuhn Organ from 1955 which has since been relocated to the Polish Baltic Philharmonic in Gdańsk, Poland. The organist is Jean-Christophe Geiser.

I Positif de dos C–
Quintadehn	16′
Prinzipal	8′
Gedackt	8′
Oktave	4′
Rohrflöte	4′
Grosse Tierce	3^{1}/_{5}′
Nasard	2^{2}/_{3}′
Doublette	2′
Quarte de Nasard	2′
Tierce	1^{3}/_{5}′
Larigot	1^{1}/_{3}′
Piccolo	1′
Plein-jeu V
Scharff IV
Dulcian	16′
Cromorne	8′

II Grand Orgue C–
Principal	32′
Montre	16′
Bourdon	16′
Montre	8′
Gambe	8′
Flûte harmonique	8′
Prestant	4′
Octave	4′
Quinte	2^{2}/_{3}′
Doublette	2′
Terz	1^{3}/_{5}′
Fourniture VII
Cymbale V
Mixtur VI-IX
Bombarde	16′
Trompette	8′
Clairon	4′
Trommet	16′
Trommet	8′

III Positif Expressif C–
Salicional	8′
Unda maris	8′ (C0)
Flûte harmonique	8′
Bourdon	8′
Voix éolienne	8′ (C0)
Fugara	4′
Zartflöte	4′
Violine	2′
Sesquialtera II
Harmonica aetheria V
Cor anglais	16′
Basson	8′
Clairon	4′

IV Récit expressif C–
Bourdon	16′
Diapason	8′
Viole de gambe	8′
Voix céleste	8′
Flûte traversière	8′
Bourdon	8′
Prestant	4′
Flûte octaviante	4′
Quinte	2^{2}/_{3}′
Octavin	2′
Tierce	1^{3}/_{5}′
Plein jeu IV
Bombarde	16′
Trompette harmonique	8′
Clairon harmonique	4′
Basson-Hautbois	8′
Clarinet	8′
Voix humaine	8′

V Bombardes C–
Montre	8′
Flûte creuse	8′
Flûte ouverte	4′
Grand Cornet V
Trompette	8′
Clairon	4′
Trompette en chamade	8′
Clairon en chamade	4′

Fernwerk C–^{Clavier flottant.}
Bourdon	16′
Principal	8′
Bourdon	8′
Flûte	8′
Flûte d′amour	8′
Salicional	8′
Voix céleste	8′
Prestant	4′
Flûte traversière	4′
Trompette harmonique	8′
Voix humaine	8′

Pedal C–
Principal	32′
Bourdon	32′
Grosse Quinte	21^{1}/_{3}′
Contrebasse	16′
Montre	16′
Principal	16′
Violonbasse	16′
Bourdon	16′
Basse Quinte	10^{2}/_{3}′
Octave	8′
Violoncelle	8′
Flûte	8′
Bourdon	8′
Quinte	5^{1}/_{3}′
Octave	4′
Flûte	4′
Mixture IV
Contre-Bombarde	32′
Bombarde classique	16′
Bombarde	16′
Trompette	8′
Clairon	4′
Posaune	16′
Trommet	16′
Trommet	8′

Guided tours of the great organ are available in English, French and German by request.

== The bells ==
The cathedral has a total of seven bells that are suspended on two floors of the belfry. The two biggest bells are located on the lower level while all the other bells are on the top level. The oldest bell dates back to 1493 while the most recent bells date back 1898.

#	Name	Year	Diameter	Note
1	Marie-Madeleine/le bourdon	1583	208 cm	A flat
2	Clémence	1518	174 cm	C
3	Lombarde	1493	138 cm	E flat
4	Centenaire 1	1898	111 cm	F
5	1666	1666	102 cm	A flat
6	Centenaire 2	1898	82 cm	B flat
7	Couvre-feu	1400-1500	82 cm	C

The bells are still in use today to mark the hours.

== Tomb of Otto de Grandson ==
The cathedral has the fourteenth century tomb of the Savoyard knight, Otto de Grandson (c. 1238–1328), the third cousin, lifelong friend and envoy of King Edward I of England. Grandson had been the Justiciar of North Wales, Governor of the Channel Islands and leader of the English knights at the Siege of Acre (1291).

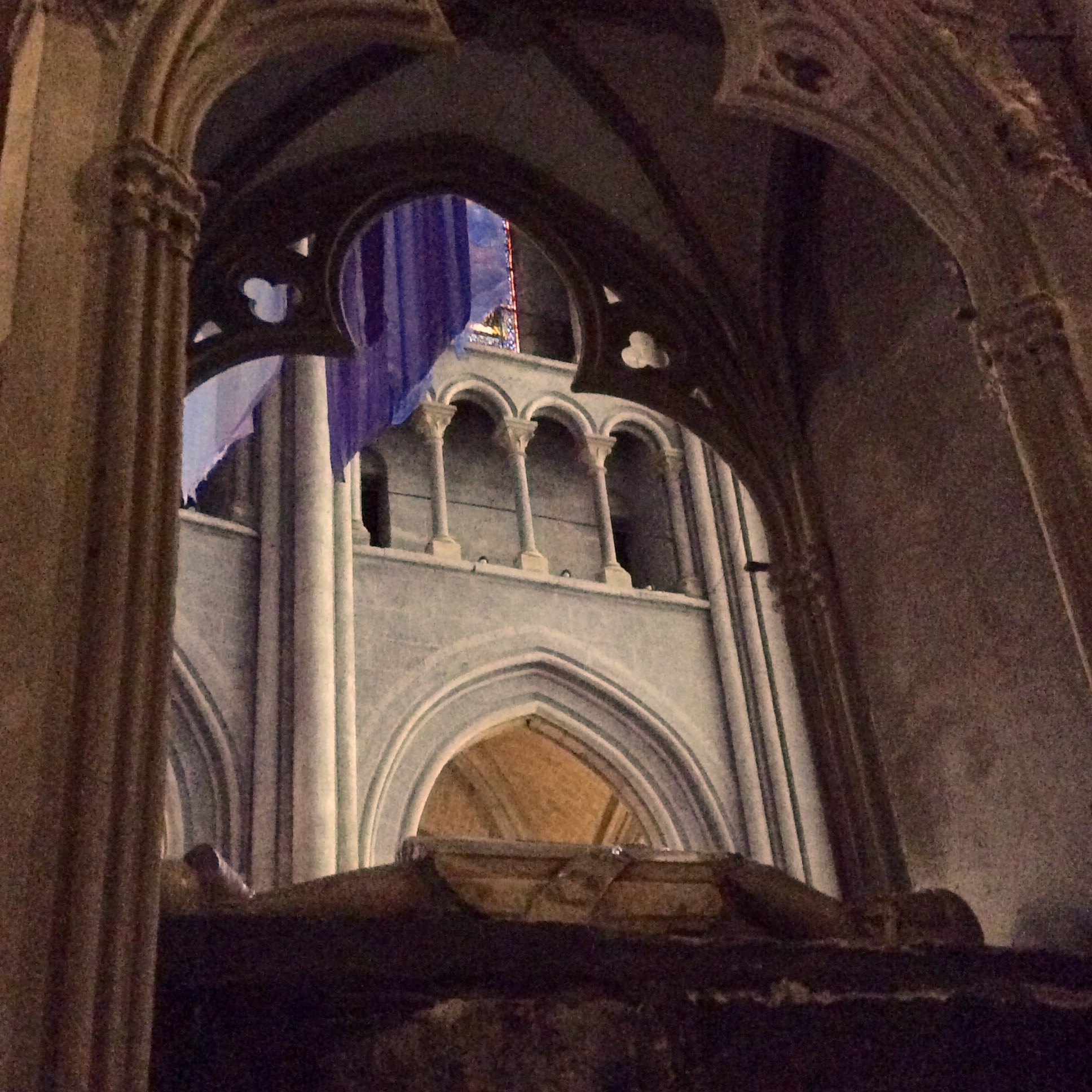
Tomb of Otto de Grandson in Lausanne Cathedral.

William I de Genève descendants

== Lookout ==
Since 1405 until the present day without interruption, the city of Lausanne has maintained a lookout in the cathedral bell tower. The lookout announces the time by yelling the hour from 10 pm to 2 am, 365 days a year. The lookout cries the hour to each cardinal direction « C'est le guet, il a sonné [dix] » ("It's the lookout, it rang [ten]"). The original purpose of the lookout was to provide a warning in case of fire though it has now become a traditional function. Since 2002, the official lookout is Renato Häusler, who beat out 58 other applicants for the job. He intends to retire in 2024 when he turns 65. The first female lookout, Cassandre Berdoz, was selected as deputy in 2021.

== See also ==
- List of cathedrals in Switzerland
