= Hunting in Switzerland =

Legal hunting activities in Switzerland

Hunting Act
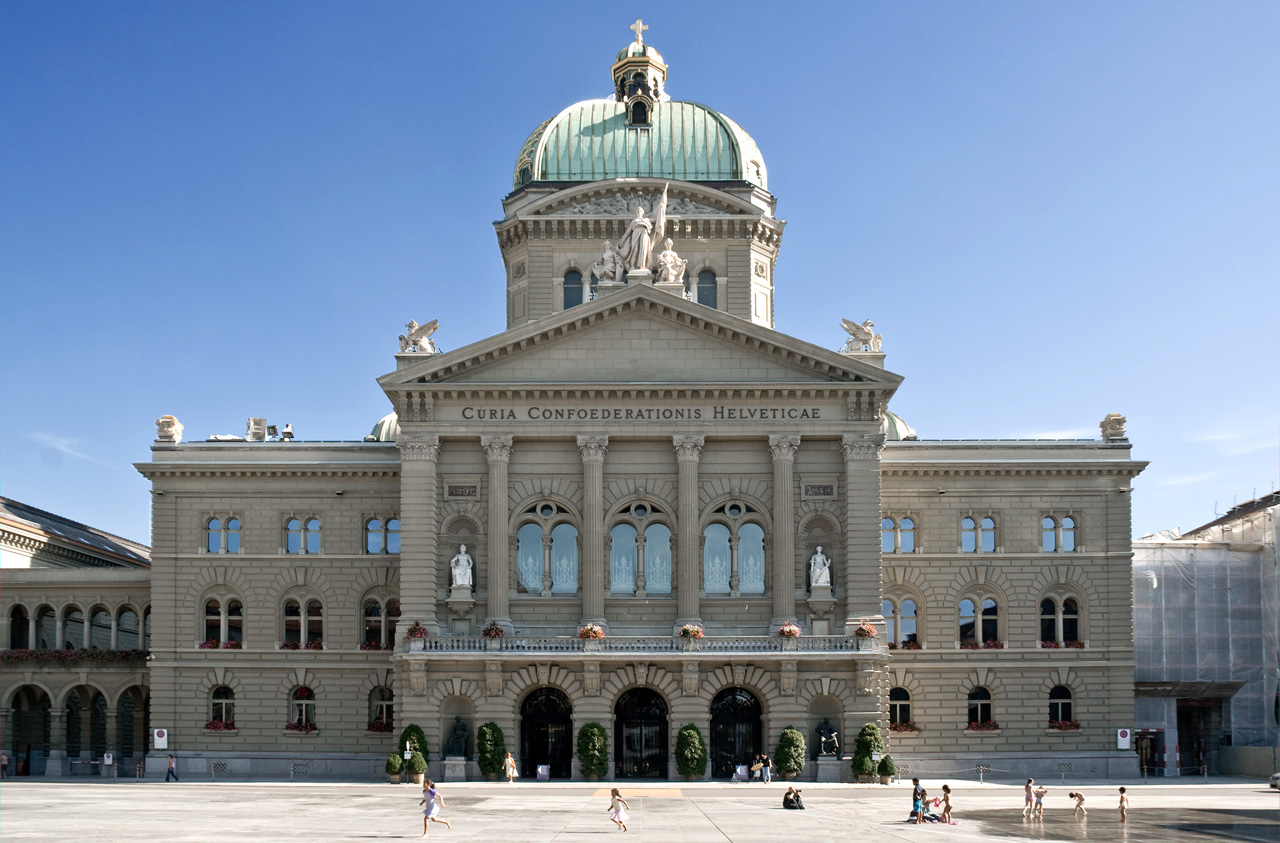

Federal Assembly of Switzerland
- Long title: Federal Act on Hunting and the Protection of Mammals and Birds (SR 922.0)
- Territorial extent: Switzerland
- Enacted by: Federal Assembly of Switzerland
- Enacted: 20 June 1986
- Commenced: 1 April 1988

Repeals
- Federal Act on Hunting and the Protection of Birds (1925)
- Status: Current legislation

Hunting in Switzerland is a regulated activity governed by federal and cantonal legislation, with a history spanning hundreds of thousands of years. Modern hunting in Switzerland is primarily managed through the Hunting Act (Note: German: Jagdgesetz, JSG; French: Loi sur la chasse, LChP; Italian: Legge sulla caccia, LCP) of 1986, implemented by the Federal Office for the Environment (FOEN) and administered by individual cantons.

== History ==
=== Prehistoric and ancient periods ===
For hundreds of thousands of years, hunting, along with gathering, formed the basis of human nutrition, with gathering predominating. The oldest evidence of hunters in Switzerland, dating back approximately 200,000 years, has been found near Chur, in the regions of Säntis, Churfirsten and Rigi, as well as in the Simmental and the Jura.

During the Paleolithic period, hunters primarily targeted mammoths and woolly rhinoceros. Later, reindeer, bison, wild horses, "red game" (red deer and roe deer) and "black game" (wild boar) constituted the main prey. Bears, ibex, chamois, marmots and ptarmigan retreated to the Alpine zone after the retreat of the glaciers. Game was typically captured in traps or killed with weapons (javelins, clubs, slings) during drives or ambush hunting. With the emergence of agriculture and livestock farming during the Neolithic period, hunting lost its primary importance, becoming a complement to the production economy and serving to protect herds, plantations and humans from wild animals.

=== Medieval period ===
Prehistoric hunting was free and remained so after the emergence of land ownership. This freedom persisted through the settlement by the Celts, Roman colonization, and the arrival of the Alemanni, Burgundians and Lombards. Under the Merovingians and Carolingians, especially during the reign of Charlemagne, the increasing limitation of hunting freedom extended to Switzerland. When Frankish sovereigns began controlling ownerless forests, they appropriated the rights of clearing and hunting in much of the empire. Additionally, game bans were decreed in vast territories, reserving the right to hunt certain species for lords.

During the High and Late Middle Ages, hunting rights, like most regalian rights, were gradually transferred from the king to his vassals with the establishment of the feudal system. In territories subject to lords (nobles, chapters and convents) or oligarchs (imperial cities such as Zurich, Bern or Solothurn), hunting remained a seigneurial privilege, while it remained free in rural cantons and some mountain regions. Disputes arose even there: in 1311, during the Marchenstreit, the Einsiedeln Abbey claimed hunting and falconry rights against the people of Schwyz in the Wägi valley before an arbitral tribunal.

In Grisons, red deer and wild boar were banned, in Upper Engadin and Rheinwald the chamois, and in Prättigau the ibex. In 1526, the Articles of Ilanz, when the Three Leagues united, introduced hunting freedom for the population. Unlike the Bishop of Chur, who graciously granted hunting rights, the Three Leagues continued for some time to sell them for payment until the jurisdictions bought them back.

=== Early modern period ===
During the Late Middle Ages and under the Ancien Régime, hunting was regulated by an increasing number of ordinances, decrees and mandates. In rural cantons, these provisions generally appeared in general customary law, as in Glarus in 1448. The ordinances stipulated opening periods, prohibitions on killing or capturing certain species, banned the use of particular weapons and devices, regulated the use of dogs, and fixed premiums for eliminating harmful animals such as bears, wolves and wild boar.

To preserve fauna, mountains and forests were banned or declared exempt, meaning they were subject to total or partial prohibition (limited to certain species). In 1511, a ban district was created in Unterwalden, in 1533 the Blattenberg (Oberhasli) became exempt, and in 1548, the people of Glarus banned the Kärpf, which has remained a "exempt mountain" to this day.

Surveillance fell mainly to hunting chambers, master hunters and commissions from the 17th century onwards, which issued permits and authorizations, paid premiums for capturing carnivores and subsidies for nets used to capture wolves, monitored compliance with prohibitions, pronounced sanctions and controlled game sales.

With the Helvetic Republic, the era of seigneurial privileges ended, including hunting; in 1800, it opened to all. It was limited only by a prohibition until September 15; municipalities collected permit fees. A commission was tasked with developing a law for all of Switzerland; the project was accepted by the Grand Council of the Republic but failed before the Senate. During the Act of Mediation, competence was transferred to the cantons, leading to a proliferation of laws and ordinances during the first half of the 19th century.

In 1803, Aargau was the only canton to adopt leased hunting, with the allocation of hunting districts. This first law (as would be the case with all subsequent federal or cantonal laws) remained attached to the principle of regalian right, with only the state having sovereignty over game, which has no owner; hunting rights are not linked to land ownership.

=== Federal legislation development ===
The decline in game revealed the inadequacy of cantonal laws. Concordats signed between some cantons had no lasting success. The need to adopt uniform provisions for the entire Swiss territory was not disputed. Article 25 of the Federal Constitution of 1874 authorized the Confederation to legislate, primarily for the conservation of large game and the protection of birds useful to agriculture and forestry. The law was promulgated on September 17, 1875.

== Modern hunting legislation ==
=== Federal Act of 1875 ===
The first federal hunting law contained several provisions that strongly influenced wildlife and hunting development. Particularly notable were species protection measures, severe for the time. Large game hunting was limited to fourteen days between September 1 and October 15, and killing mothers and their young was prohibited. These measures aimed to increase populations of species that had practically disappeared from Switzerland by the end of the 19th century (red deer, ibex) and others that had survived only in very small numbers (roe deer, chamois).

Equally significant was the creation of numerous federal wildlife refuges in the Alps, sometimes representing areas of over 100 km^{2}, where game, except carnivores, was rigorously protected. These regions were placed under the surveillance of game wardens, originally employed part-time, primarily tasked with preventing poaching.

These measures enabled the exceptional multiplication of roe deer, chamois, deer and ibex over the past hundred years. The phenomenon was particularly pronounced in ban zones. Animal numbers increased to such an extent that even unprotected regions became increasingly populated. By the end of the 20th century, if 150,000 roe deer, more than 100,000 chamois, between 30,000 and 40,000 deer and 16,000 ibex lived in Switzerland, this was only possible because forests, the main game biotopes, were also protected; the federal forest law was indeed promulgated in 1876.

=== Hunting organization ===
At the end of the 19th century and in the first half of the 20th century, hunters organized into four associations: the General Association of Swiss Hunters (leased or farmed hunting), the Swiss Federation of Licensed Hunter Societies (German-speaking Switzerland), Diana, Swiss Hunter Society (French-speaking Switzerland) and the Ticino Hunter Federation. In 1985, they regrouped into the Federation of Swiss Hunter Associations.

Except for Aargau, all cantons had rallied to the permit (or patent) system by 1875. This system allowed anyone meeting certain conditions (reputation, citizenship, fulfillment of tax obligations) to obtain a permit authorizing hunting throughout the canton. In the leased hunting system, clearly defined territories, with surface areas varying between 500 and 1,000 hectares, were and are still leased to societies that have exclusivity over them. While the first was called "people's hunting," the second was considered "lord's hunting."

The transition from the permit system to the hunting district system in the cantons of Schaffhausen (1915, partially repealed in 1921), Zurich (1929), Thurgau (1930), Solothurn (1933), Lucerne (1941), St. Gallen (1950), Basel-Stadt and Basel-Landschaft, sometimes led to virulent political discussions. In other cantons, the permit system was maintained, except in Geneva where specialized agents from the competent cantonal department are responsible for regulatory missions.

=== 1962 and 1986 revisions ===
While the partial revision of the law in 1925 accentuated the orientation taken in 1875, important modifications were made in 1962, motivated by the increase in damage caused by game and the decline of various species. However, the principle of increasing roe deer, chamois, deer and ibex populations was maintained, while introducing provisions to prevent damage and reimburse losses. The concept of nature conservation appeared: lynx, bears, beavers, otters, capercaillie, partridges and eagles were protected.

The total revision of 1986 resulted in a new federal law on hunting and the protection of wild mammals and birds, whose main objective became the conservation of species diversity. The requirement to increase the population of the four most widespread ungulate species was abandoned: hunting should result in their case in the constant balance of their numbers. Efforts were also made to reduce game damage to an acceptable level while protecting threatened species. Within the framework of task distribution, the Confederation primarily deals with wildlife protection issues, while cantons handle hunting regulation.

== Current hunting systems ==
Switzerland operates two main hunting systems: patent hunting (Note: German: Patentjagd; French: Chasse à patente; Italian: Caccia a patente) and leased hunting (Note: German: Revierjagd; French: Chasse affermée; Italian: La caccia in riserva), with a special regime in Geneva.

=== Patent hunting ===
Under the patent system, licensed hunters may pursue game across an entire canton's territory, with the exception of federally and cantonally designated protected zones including wildlife sanctuaries and bird reserves. Cantonal authorities grant hunting patents to qualified individuals upon payment of licensing fees. Patent holders are authorized to harvest a predetermined quota of animals, with hunting activities confined to several weeks during the autumn period.

The following cantons operate under patent hunting regulations: Bern, Uri, Schwyz, Obwalden, Nidwalden, Glarus, Zug, Fribourg, Appenzell Ausserrhoden, Appenzell Innerrhoden, Grisons, Ticino, Vaud, Valais, Neuchâtel, and Jura.

=== Leased hunting ===
Under the leased hunting model, local municipalities grant exclusive hunting privileges to organized groups of licensed hunters (hunting associations) for specified periods, typically lasting eight years. These associations operate within designated territorial boundaries and must provide cantonal authorities with detailed harvest reports documenting the number and species of animals taken during each season.

The leased hunting system operates in the following cantons: Zurich, Lucerne, Solothurn, Basel-Stadt, Basel-Landschaft, Schaffhausen, St. Gallen, Aargau, and Thurgau.

=== Special hunting regime ===
In Geneva, hunting was banned in 1974 following a popular vote. Since then, state game wardens intervene as needed in ungulate populations.

== Hunter training and licensing ==
Anyone wishing to practice hunting needs a hunting authorization, obtained through training accompanied by examinations. Training is organized by the cantons and varies in duration and content. Some cantons recognize qualifications from other cantons.

Hunters must regularly demonstrate shooting accuracy at recognized hunting shooting ranges. Most cantons require annual shooting tests to maintain hunting privileges. Hunting with dogs requires additional specialized training and testing.

== Protected areas ==
To protect and conserve certain rare and threatened species of wild mammals and birds, and to maintain populations of huntable species, the Confederation has delimited a network of federal wildlife refuges and waterfowl and migratory bird reserves. This network is complemented by protected areas and wildlife tranquility zones created by the cantons.

== Game species and hunting seasons ==
The Federal Act on Hunting establishes closed seasons for different species, during which hunting is prohibited. Cantons may extend protection periods or reduce the list of huntable species. Species that may be hunted include various ungulates (red deer, roe deer, chamois, wild boar), lagomorphs (European hare, mountain hare), various birds, and certain carnivores.

Some species are protected year-round, while others like raccoon dog, raccoon, and feral cats may be hunted throughout the year. The hunting season typically occurs in autumn, with specific dates varying by species and canton.

== Wildlife damage and compensation ==
The law provides for compensation for damage caused by wildlife to forests, crops, and livestock. Cantons regulate compensation, which is paid only when reasonable preventive measures have been taken and the damage is not insignificant. The Confederation and cantons participate in compensating damage caused by certain protected species.

== Contemporary issues ==
In recent decades, criticism of hunters by animal protection groups has intensified. Initiatives demanding hunting bans were accepted by Geneva in 1974 but rejected by Vaud in 1977. In Ticino, a petition demanding the abolition of small game hunting was rejected in a popular consultation in 1992.

These criticisms have notably led to changes in hunting legitimation. Today, hunters – as emphasized by their associations and relevant administrations – serve the ecosystem by regulating animal populations and contributing to species diversity protection. However, controversy over lynx propagation has revealed flaws in the alliance between hunters and ecologists.

== See also ==
- List of federal hunting reserves in Switzerland
