= Botanical Garden St. Gallen =

Botanical garden in St. Gallen, Switzerland

Coordinates: 47.439876°N 9.407532°E

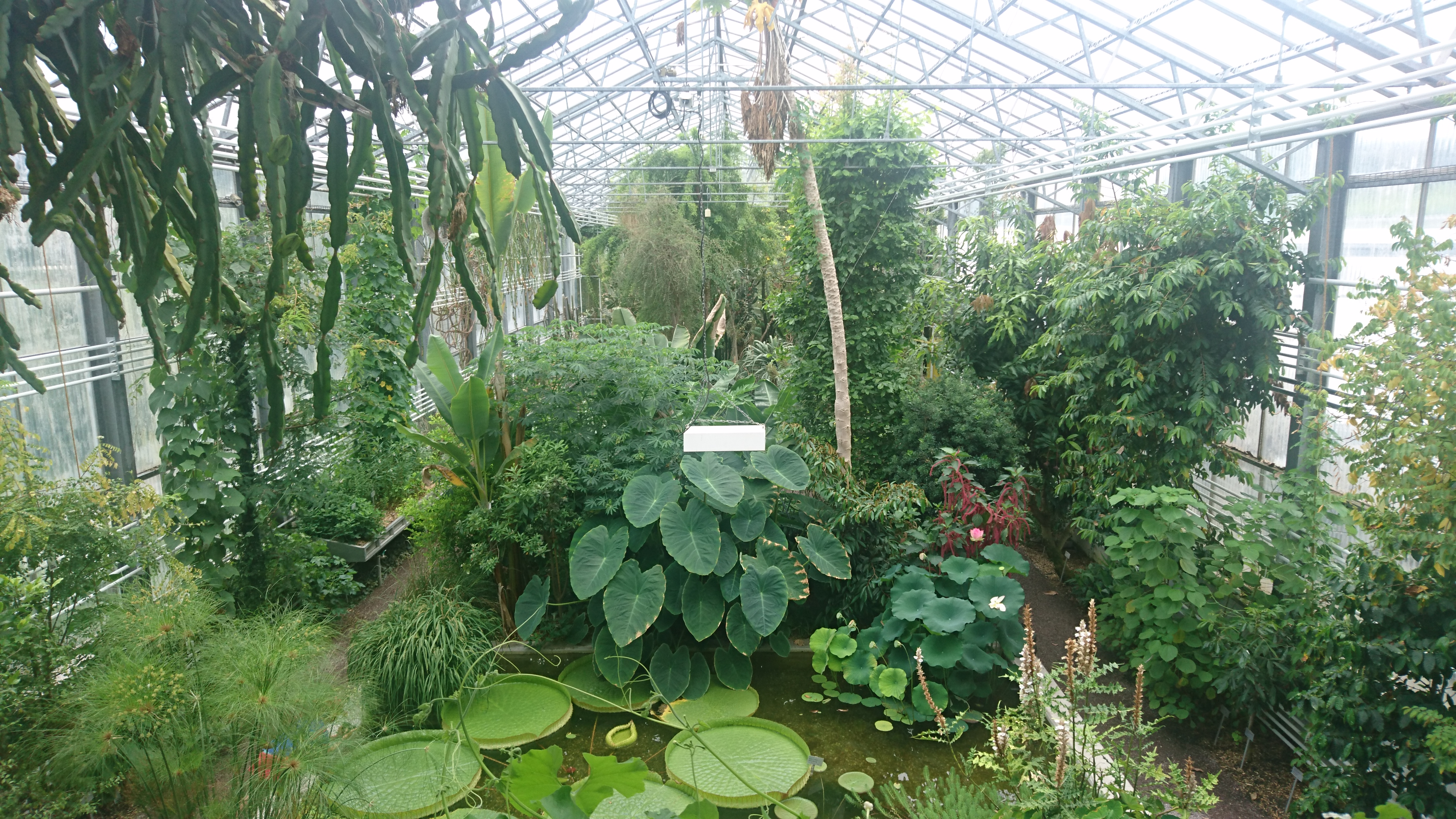
In the palm house of the botanical garden St. Gallen

The Botanical Garden St. Gallen is located in Stephanshornstrasse 4, Neudorf, St. Gallen. It features 8000 labeled plants from all over the world in its open-air displays and several greenhouses. The park and the greenhouses are accessible free of charge during opening hours.

== History ==
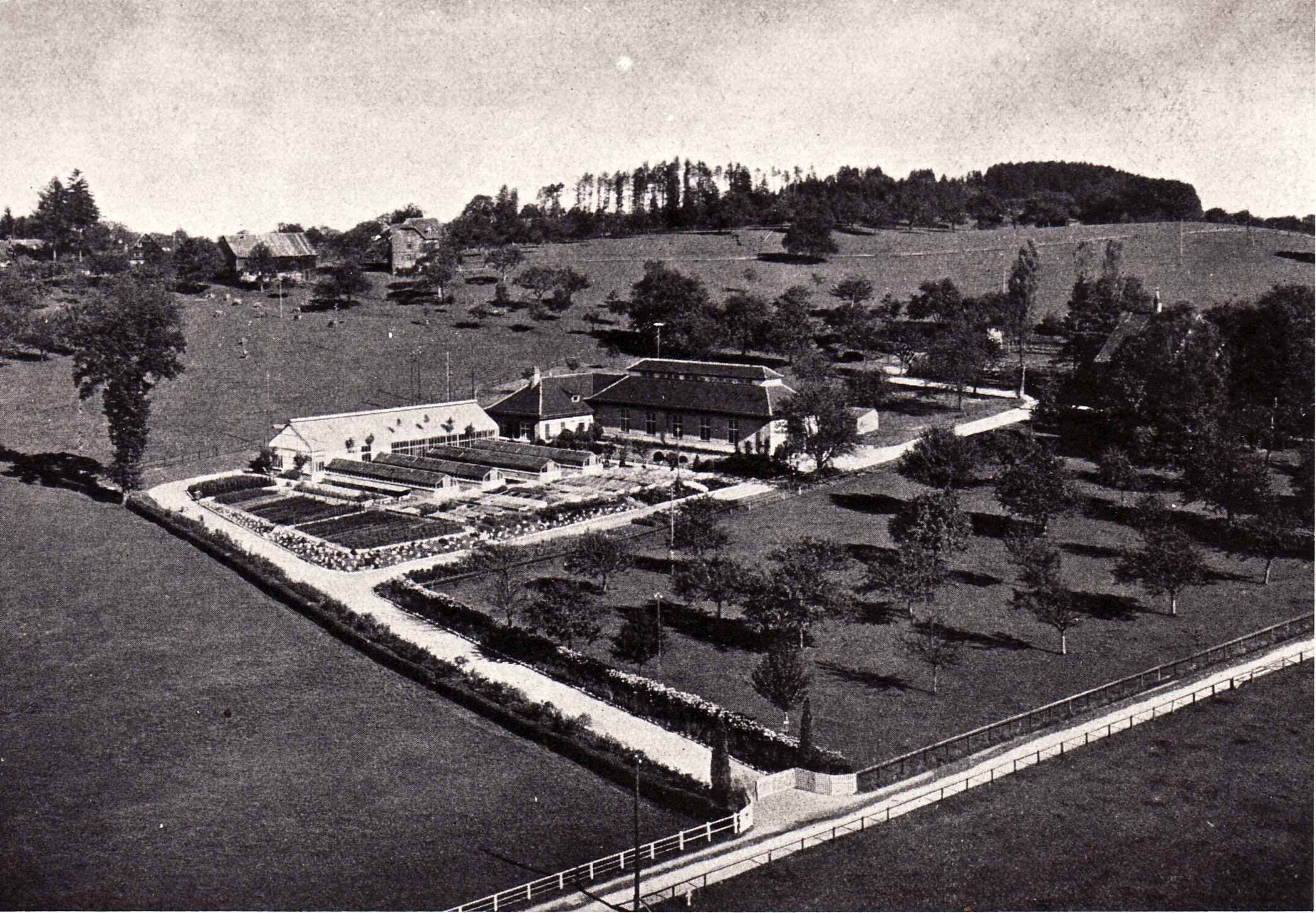
The area of today's botanical garden in 1919 with the municipal nursery and the building of 1914, which is now used as an orangery

The first botanical garden in St. Gallen was established in 1878 in the municipal park east of the newly built Museum of Nature. The museum's director was the botanist and plant collector Friedrich Bernhard Wartmann, who desired to complement the exhibits of the museum with a living plant collection. He created the 6000 m^{2} (1.5 acres) garden (which also included an alpine garden) with his friend Theodor Schlatter (1847–1918), a botanist and teacher. The largest part of this display garden was demolished in 1918, to make space for the new Museum of History and Ethnology.

The second botanical garden was built near the University of Teacher Education St. Gallen. It was demolished in 1934 due to construction work.

The ground-breaking ceremony occurred by turning the first sod on 16 June 1945 in the Stephanshorn area of Neudorf, where the municipal nursery had been for decades. Initially, several school classes from St. Gallen and their biology teachers were involved in creating the garden, including the Head of the Gardening Office Paul Zülli. Subsequently, the expansion was managed and conducted mainly by the City of St. Gallen, who owned the park. In 1993, an architecturally noteworthy alpine house was built in the Botanical Garden. The new tropical house was built in 1998 and expanded in 2007 by erecting the orchid house. The open-air area was substantially refurbished in 2011.

== Description ==
=== Open-air area ===
The open-air area is divided in 20 departments, which are connected by walking paths. A pergola and some benches provide space for rest and contemplation. The departments contain cherry blossom and maple trees, perennial plants, an iris garden and flower beds with roses, narcissus plants, ferns and barberry plants, a raised-bed rock garden, a flower pot garden and a water garden as well as flower beds with varying themes. In the crop departments, poisonous and medicinal plants, useful plants and grasslands are shown.

==== Geographical sections ====
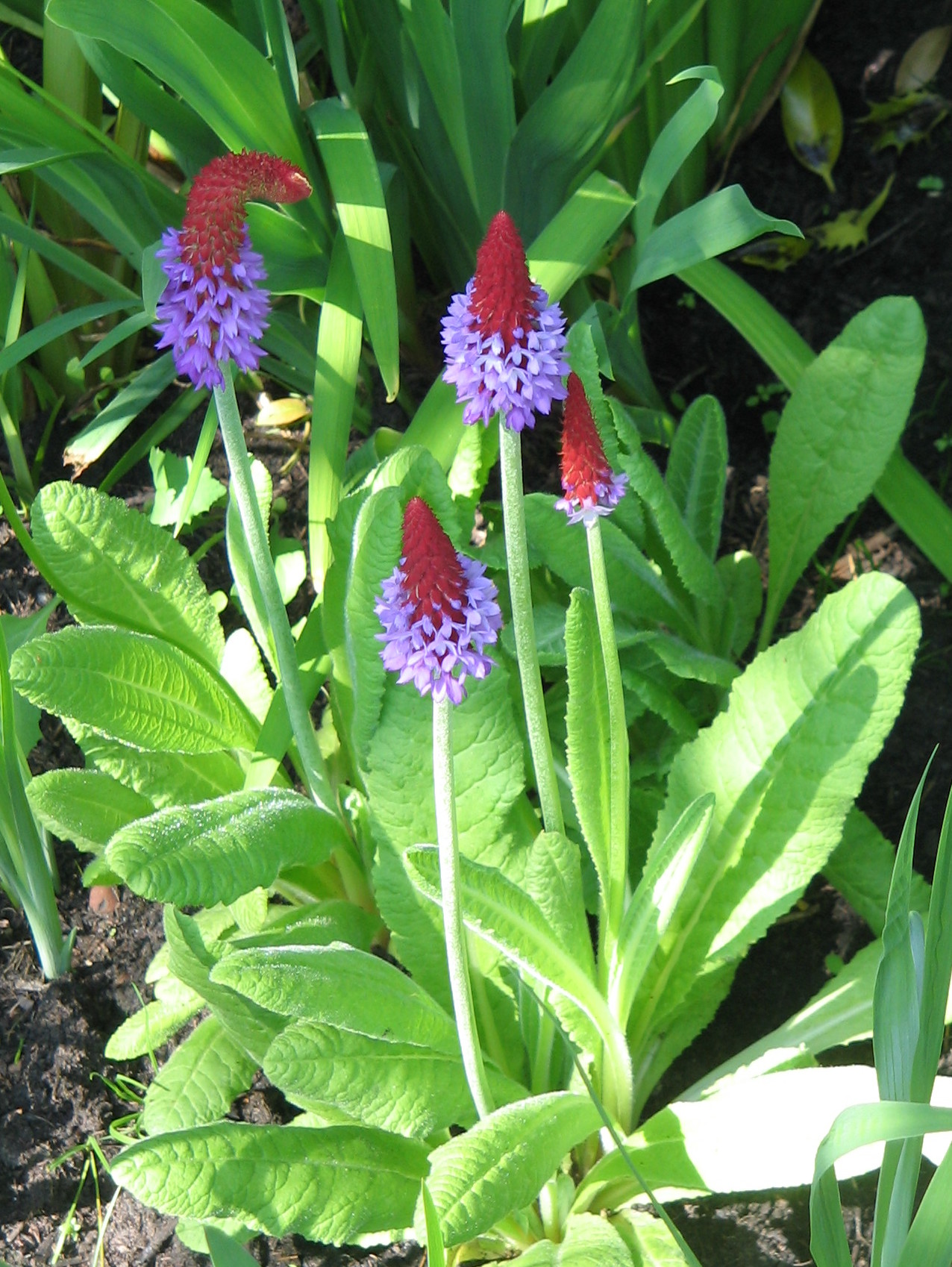
Vial's primrose (primula vialii)

In the four geographical departments Alpinum, Europe, America and Asia typical plants of the respective regions are presented. The department Europe shows in terraced beds the diversity of the native Swiss flora and the wide range of flora in the very different European climates. In the America section, an Indian summer can be experienced on a small scale in autumn with the colorfully discolored leaves of the American trees and shrubs planted there.

In the geographical section of Asia, 400 plant species grow from the steppe, forest and mountain areas with different Asian climates. In the center of this section there is a Japanese garden with a small pond and a stone lantern, which was modeled after the Imperial Garden. One of the most popular places to stay in the botanical garden is the pergola, which is densely covered with Asian climbing plants. This area is particularly attractive at the heyday of the Vial's primrose (primula vialii), which has its natural location in the Chinese provinces of Yunnan and Sichuan and was planted here in hundreds.

The Alpinum department is mostly located on a slight hillside and consists of two different areas. For the Alpinum Säntisgebiet, limestone blocks were used to create rock sections for species of the alpine step. Low-growing birch species and subalpine tall perennials grow on the banks of a small pond. In the Alpinum Swiss Alps, on the other hand, older coniferous trees such as Swiss stone pine (pinus cembra) and Swiss mountain pine (pinus mugo) dominate. For alpine plants, which require more neutral to acid soil pH conditions, an area with Verrucano rock was created.

==== Educational departments ====
The three educational departments with the topics of biology, genetics and systematics are used in practical demonstrations to complement the knowledge that is only theoretically available to most visitors:

- The Department of Biology informs with the help of typical living plants about the topics flower biology, distribution biology and special plant nutrition.
- In the Department of Genetics, the laws governing the transmission of herbal characteristics to the offspring with the corresponding plants are presented. In the center of the department is the Mendel Garden named after Gregor Mendel with mutations of various trees and shrubs.
- The Department of Systematics shows around 500 different plantain plant species from 100 plant families. This area was extensively renewed and rewritten in the years 2013–2014 based on new scientific findings regarding the relationships between the plant species and the resulting renaming.

=== Greenhouses ===
Plants of the rainforest, succulents and crops such as cinnamon, coffee or vanilla are shown in a 1998 newly built large tropical green house with two pools and a grandstand. A special attraction is the basin with the Victoria water lily. In 2007, an orchid house was added to the tropical house. In an Alpine house, built in 1993 in an unusual architecture, the alpine flora is housed. Furthermore, there is the small carnivorous planthouse, an extra greenhouse for carnivorous plants, as well as a lithops house, in which living stones are shown.

=== Orangery ===
The Orangery is a unique, well-preserved historic building with a red-tiled roof that was built on this site in 1914 along with other buildings for the then municipal nursery. Its special architectural features are the supporting structure made of laminated wooden beams based on the Otto Hetzer principle and the roof lantern mounted on them, which ensures a better light incidence. Between October and May the potted plants spend the winter at the Orangery at a temperature of about 5 °C. During the summer months, there are exhibitions on natural history topics and other events.

== Activities and services ==
On the first Sunday of each month, public tours of the outdoor area and the greenhouses take place regularly. Special tours can be booked for a fee. Throughout the year, numerous public events such as lectures, readings, exhibitions and courses take place. In addition to a sponsorship association, the association Botanischer Zirkel St. Gallen also supports the organisation and implementation. Once a year, the botanical garden organizes a full-day garden party. Every autumn a public plant exchange takes place.

The Botanical Garden of St. Gallen is itself a member of the association Hortus Botanicus Helveticus and participates as such in the BOTANICA Initiative - The last of its kind, a four-week series of events of 20 botanical gardens in Switzerland, with this to draw attention to their contribution to the conservation of biodiversity. During the mushroom season, the Botanical Garden of St. Gallen operates as a public mushroom advisory center at certain times of the day from August to October and offers free provision and control of privately collected edible mushrooms.

The grandstand in the tropical house can be rented for private events with up to 50 people.

== Charity ==
One year after the last reconstruction of the botanical garden, the non-profit association Friends of the Botanical Garden of St. Gallen was founded in 1946 with the aim of providing ideal and material support for the institution. This was due, among other things, to its involvement in the financing of new greenhouses and renewal work in outdoor areas. The association supports the botanical garden in its public relations work, finances publications and conducts its own events, the proceeds of which benefit the garden.

== Publications ==
The long-standing director of the institution, Hanspeter Schumacher, published in 2013 a German language guide through the botanical garden entitled The Botanical Garden of St. Gallen: A Place of Rest, Education and Encounter (Der Botanische Garten St. Gallen: Ort der Erholung, Bildung und Begegnung). In addition, the Botanical Garden publishes a monthly information sheet in DIN A4 format. Each of these sheets covers a specific plant topic comprehensively. Each month, a newsletter with past and planned activity reports is also published.

== Works of art ==
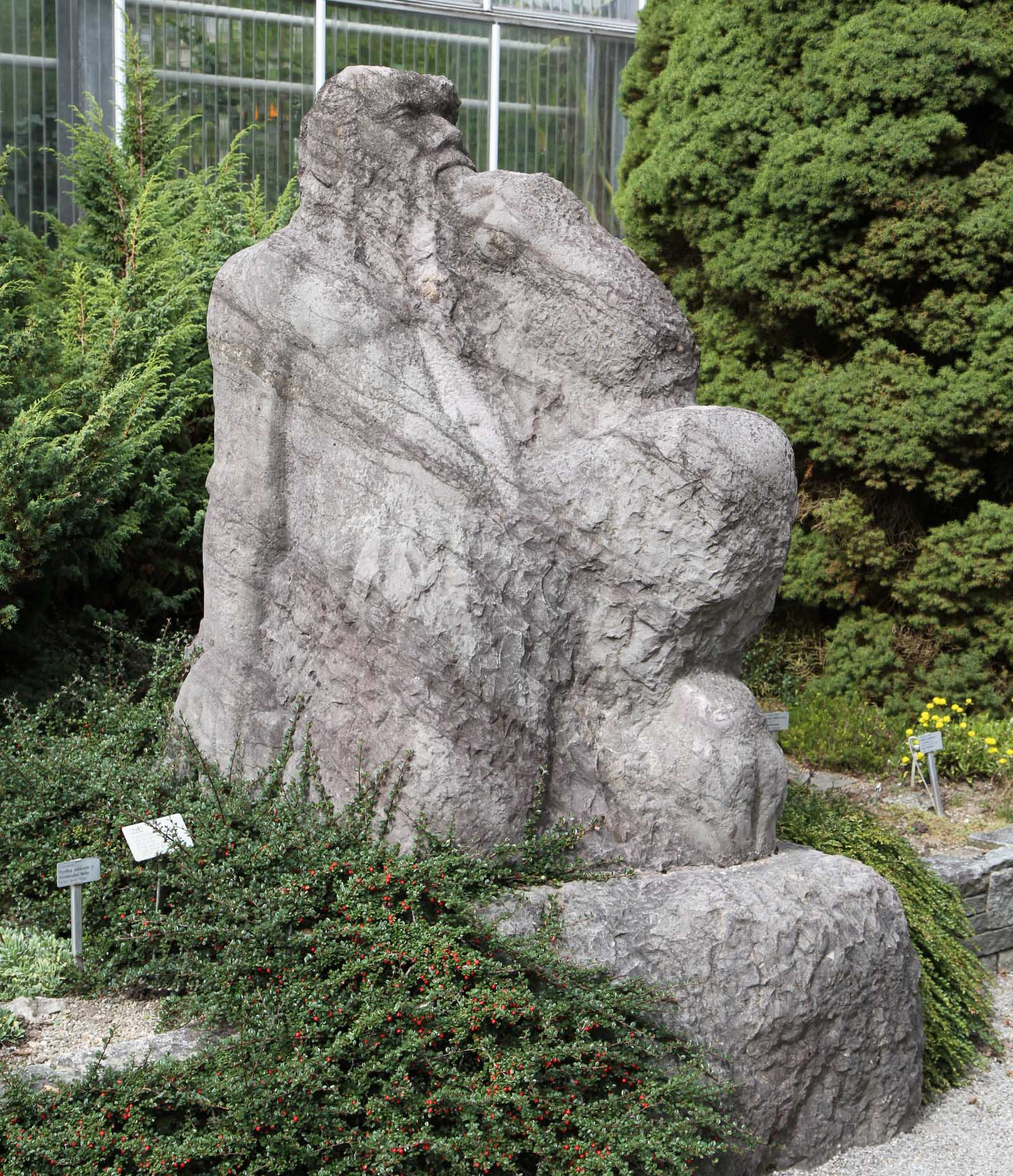
Pan by Wilhelm Meier

Works of art can be found at various locations in the outdoor area, such as the 1957 sculpture Pan by the Swiss sculptor Wilhelm Meier, whose works can be found in many parts of the city. The entrance area to the botanical garden at the sliding gate at the Stephanshornstrasse was designed with several large artistically crafted Rorschach sandstone shelves.

== Planetary path ==
The botanical garden is the starting point of the 1979 built St. Galler Planetenweg, which leads from here via Mörschwil to Obersteinach. Starting point of this 8 kilometres (5.0 mi) long thematic trail is the model of the sun next to the tropical house. The trail leads inside the garden past the scale models of Mercury and Venus to Earth and Moon.

== Literature ==
- Hanspeter Schumacher: Der Botanische Garten St. Gallen: Ort der Erholung, Bildung und Begegnung. Appenzeller-Verlag, Herisau 2013, ISBN 978-3-85882-664-0.
