= List of cathedrals in Switzerland =

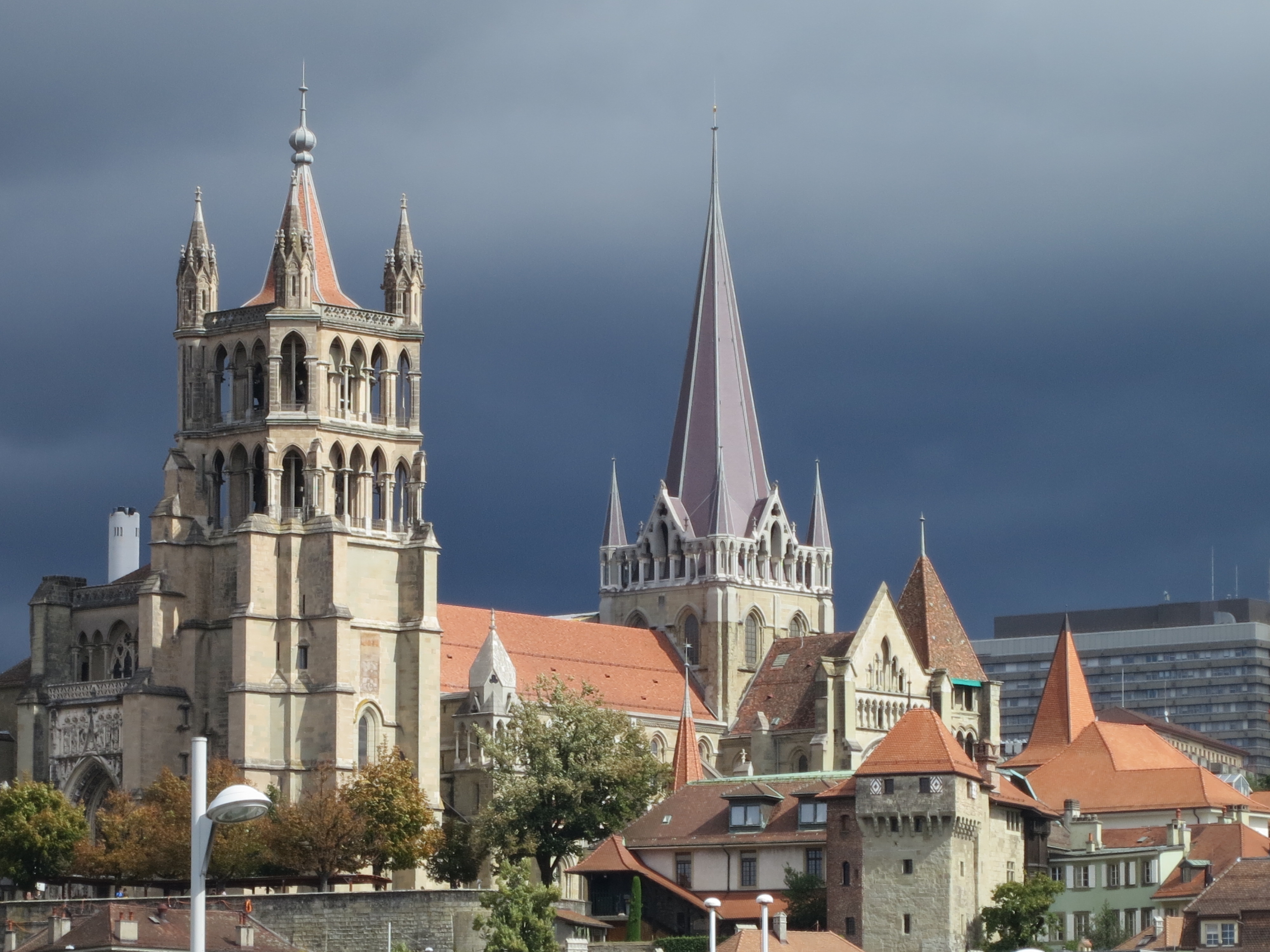
Notre Dame in Lausanne

This is the list of cathedrals in Switzerland sorted by denomination.

== Catholic ==
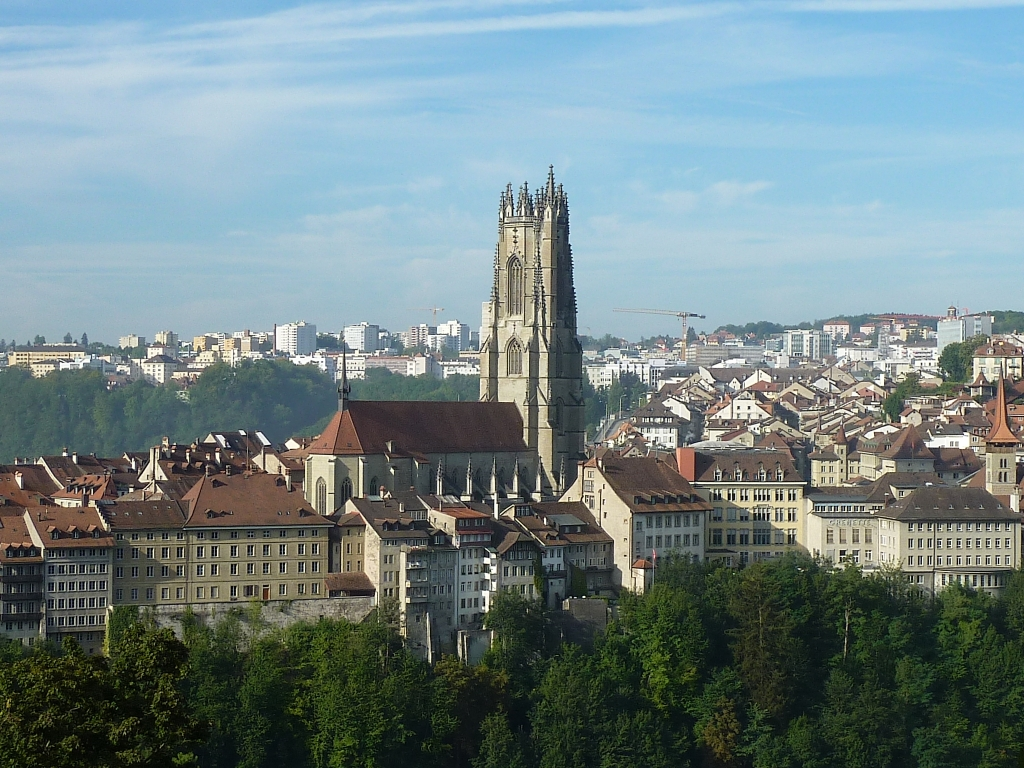
Cathedral of St Nicholas in Fribourg

Cathedrals of the Catholic Church in Switzerland:

- Cathedral of Sts. Ursus and Victor in Solothurn
- Basilica of Mary of the Assumption in Chur
- Cathedral of St. Nicholas in Fribourg
- Cathedral of St. Lawrence in Lugano
- Benedictine Abbey Cathedral of St. Maurice in Einsiedeln
- Abbey of St. Maurice in Saint-Maurice-d'Agaune
- Cathedral of Sts. Gall and Otmar in St. Gallen
- Sion Cathedral (Cathédrale Notre-Dame du Glarier) in Sion

== Reformed ==
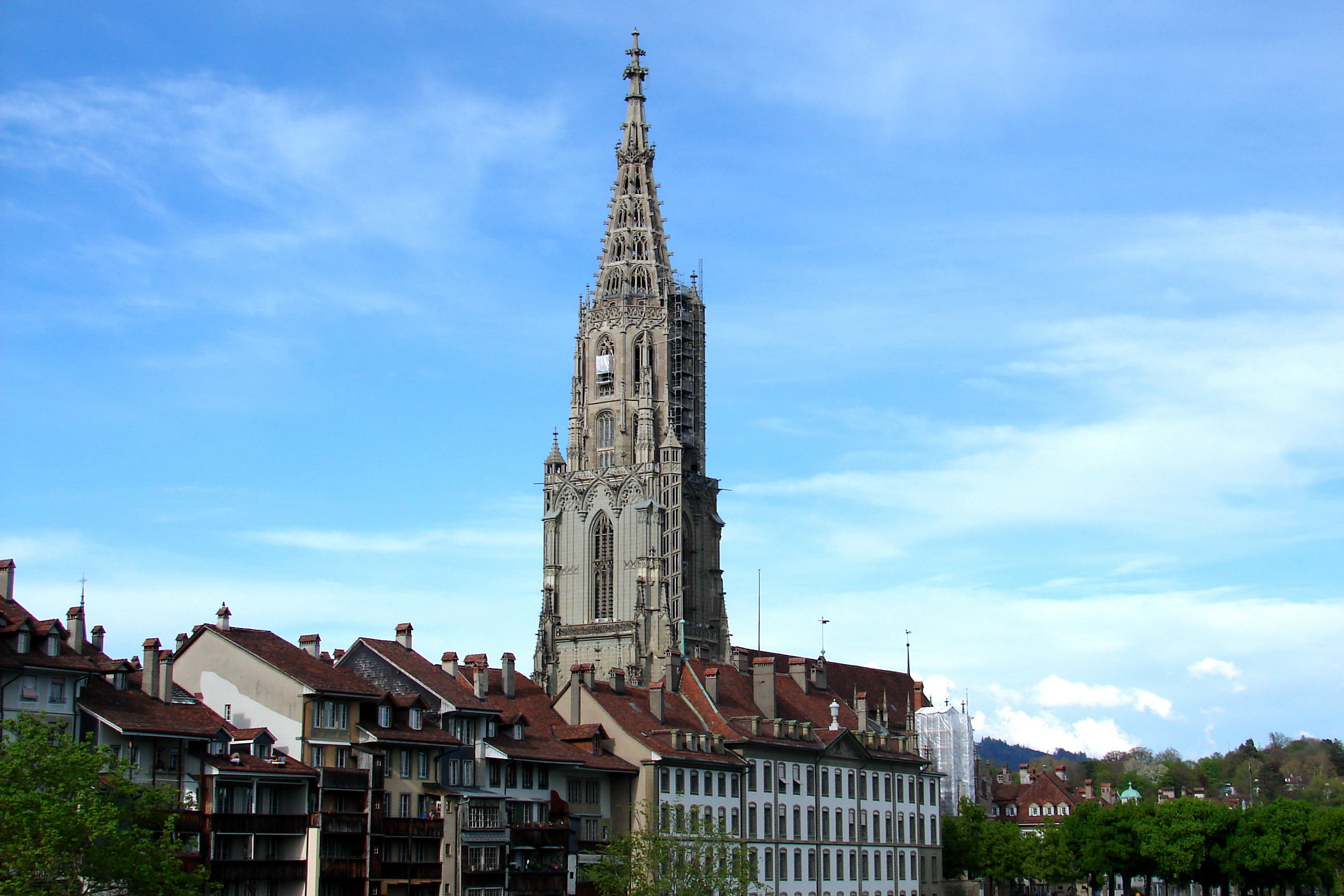
Minster in Bern

- Lausanne Cathedral (largest gothic building in Switzerland)
- Bern Minster (tallest cathedral in Switzerland)
- St. Pierre Cathedral in Geneva
- Basel Minster

== Eastern Orthodox ==
Cathedral of the Russian Orthodox Church Outside Russia:

- Holy Cross Cathedral in Geneva

== See also ==
- List of castles and fortresses in Switzerland
- Lists of cathedrals by country
- Lists of tourist attractions in Switzerland
