= Piz de Trescolmen =

Switz mountain

- Location within Switzerland

Highest point
- Elevation: 2,652 m (8,701 ft)
- Prominence: 182 m (597 ft)
- Parent peak: Piz Pian Grand
- Coordinates: 46°24′25.5″N 9°11′04.4″E

Geography
- Location: Graubünden, Switzerland
- Parent range: Lepontine Alps

Piz de Trescolmen is a mountain of the Lepontine Alps, situated in the canton of Graubünden, Switzerland. It has several summits: the highest at 2,652 metres and the southern at 2,581 metres. On its southern side it overlooks the Trescolmen Pass (2,161 m).
