= Swiss Inventory of Cultural Property of National and Regional Significance =

Cultural property register of Switzerland

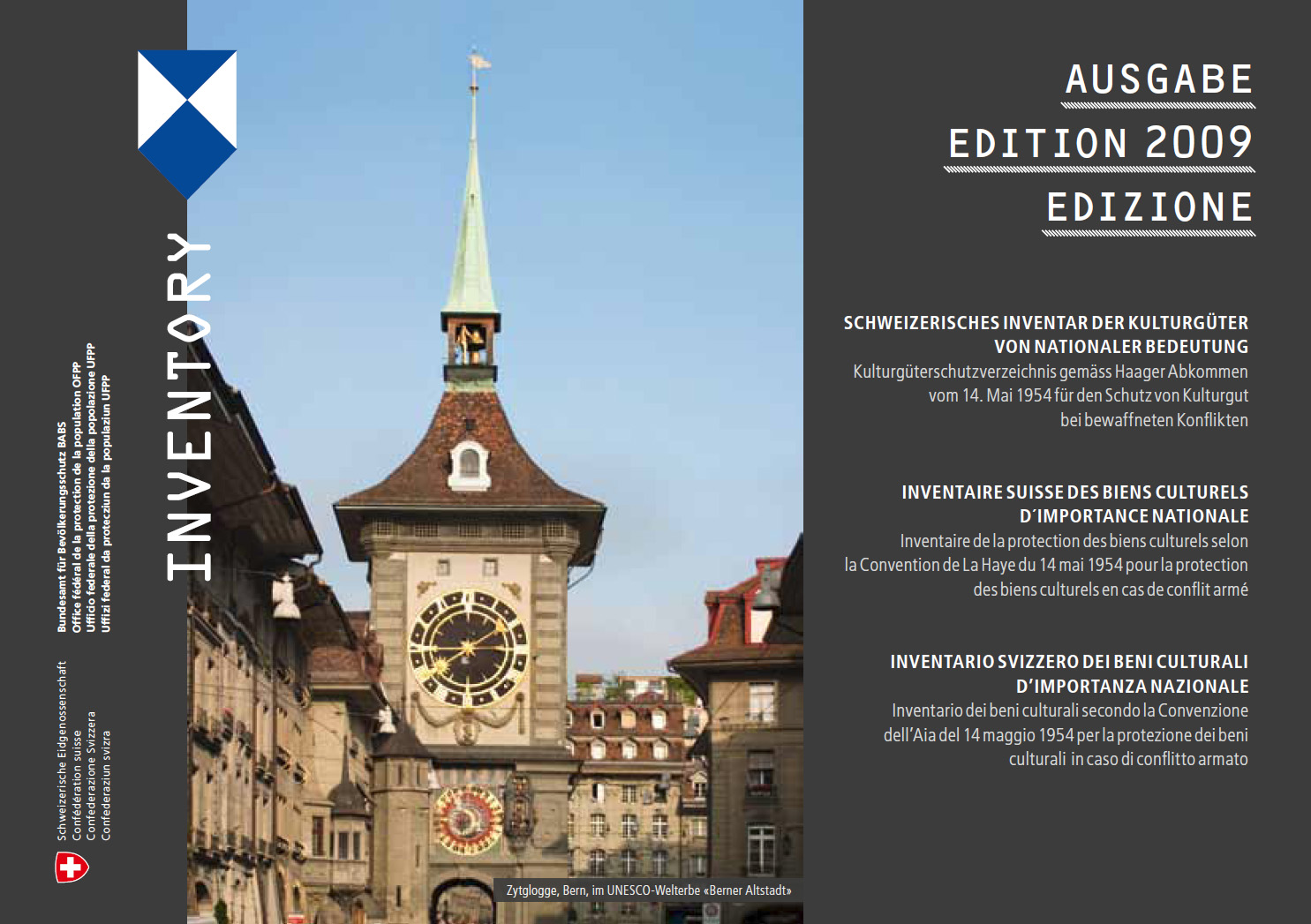
The cover of the 2009 edition of the Inventory, showing the Zytglogge in Bern and the blue shield of the Hague Convention.

The Swiss Inventory of Cultural Property of National and Regional Significance (German: Schweizerisches Inventar der Kulturgüter von nationaler und regionaler Bedeutung; French: Inventaire suisse des biens culturels d'importance nationale et régionale; Italian: Inventario dei beni culturali svizzeri d'importanza nazionale e regionale) is a register of cultural property in Switzerland. It was established according to article 5 of the second protocol to the Hague Convention for the Protection of Cultural Property in the Event of Armed Conflict, which provides for the establishment of national registers of cultural property.

== Scope ==
The register contains both mobile and immobile items of cultural property including old towns, quarters, squares, villages, sacral buildings, houses, castles, bridges, monuments, archaeological sites and collections. Its entries are classified in two groups: those of national significance (class A) and those of regional significance (class B). The selection is based on the significance of the items in the domains of history, aesthetics, art, typology, ethnography, social studies and in other scientific disciplines, as well as on their rarity value. Items of purely local significance are not included; these may be registered separately by the cantonal authorities.

== Publication history ==
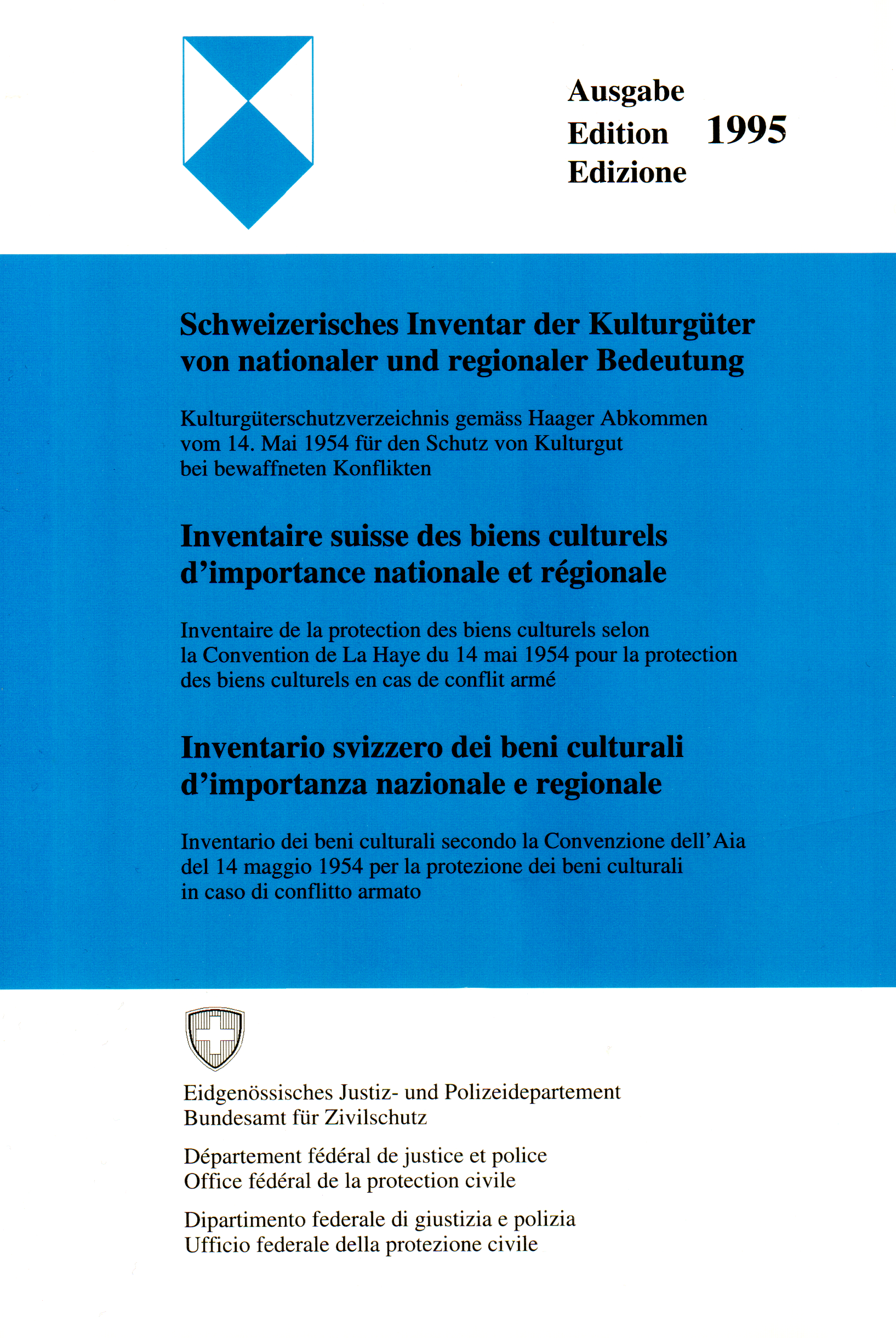
The cover of the 1995 edition

The register is prepared by the Federal Office of Civil Protection in cooperation with the cantonal authorities and formally issued by the Federal Council. It was first published in 1988 and re-issued in updated form in 1995 and 2009. The 2009 revision covers only A-class objects, with the B-class objects set to be reviewed and updated at a later time. Until then, the lists of B-class objects published by the Office include the B-class objects of the 1995 inventory, the proposals for new or changed B-class objects submitted by the cantonal authorities, and the former A-class objects not retained as nationally significant in the 2009 review.

The Federal Office of Civil Protection has made the 2009 register of A-class objects (current as of 1 April 2010) available on the Internet as a geographic information system and as a set of PDF documents. A printed catalogue (publication no. 408.980) was published in 2010.

== List details ==
A-Object Statistics
Canton	A-Object Type				A-Object Category								
Canton	Single Object or Site	Museum, Archive, Library or Church Collection	Archeological Site	Other Objects	Religious Building or Item	Manufacturing, Industry, Trade or Tourist Structure	Transportation Facility	Military Facility or Fortification	Home, Castle or Farm	Archeological Site	Memorial, Plaque or Fountain	Museum, Archive or Library	Total (Type or Category)
Aargau	178	11	48	1	49	57	6	4	62	48	1	11	238
Appenzell Ausserrhoden	35	6	0	0	3	10	6	1	15	0	0	6	41
Appenzell Innerrhoden	11	2	3	0	3	2	0	0	6	3	0	2	16
Basel-Landschaft	38	6	22	0	9	5	3	0	21	22	0	6	66
Basel-Stadt	70	32	3	0	20	20	3	1	23	3	3	32	105
Bern	353	43	30	4	58	88	23	6	166	30	16	43	430
Fribourg	206	14	17	1	56	25	11	5	100	17	10	14	238
Genève	94	46	10	0	10	28	4	2	43	10	7	46	150
Glarus	33	6	4	0	2	9	2	4	16	4	0	6	43
Graubünden	174	15	26	0	66	18	9	2	78	26	1	15	215
Jura	31	6	11	0	9	2	2	3	15	11	0	6	48
Luzern	89	26	17	6	31	24	12	3	23	17	2	26	138
Neuchâtel	90	18	23	0	13	25	1	3	37	23	11	18	131
Nidwalden	12	2	3	1	2	2	1	0	7	3	1	2	18
Obwalden	27	6	3	1	11	5	1	1	8	3	2	6	37
St. Gallen	79	15	15	1	25	21	5	1	27	15	1	15	110
Schaffhausen	47	7	17	0	7	13	0	4	23	17	0	7	71
Schwyz	53	8	9	1	18	4	2	3	25	9	2	8	71
Solothurn	35	9	11	0	10	4	2	2	16	11	1	9	55
Thurgau	84	17	16	0	33	15	3	2	31	16	0	17	117
Ticino	159	28	29	0	79	26	0	10	44	29	0	28	216
Uri	42	3	2	0	7	11	2	0	18	2	4	3	47
Valais	61	16	13	2	21	14	4	3	21	13	0	16	92
Vaud	190	46	32	2	45	44	7	3	88	32	5	46	270
Zug	16	9	5	0	4	2	0	1	9	5	0	9	30
Zürich	209	68	52	2	40	75	15	1	79	52	1	68	331
Total	2416	465	421	22	631	549	124	65	1001	421	68	465	3324

== See also ==
- Inventory of Swiss Heritage Sites
- Architecture of Switzerland
- List of castles and fortresses in Switzerland
- List of museums in Switzerland
- Lists of tourist attractions in Switzerland
