= Alpjuhorn =

Mountain in Switzerland

- Location within Switzerland

Highest point
- Elevation: 3,144 m (10,315 ft)
- Prominence: 264 m (866 ft)
- Coordinates: 46°22′2″N 7°54′31″E

Geography
- Location: Valais, Switzerland
- Parent range: Bernese Alps

The Alpjuhorn is a mountain of the Bernese Alps, located north of Mund in Valais. It is situated on the ridge separating the Baltschiedertal and the Gredetschtal.
