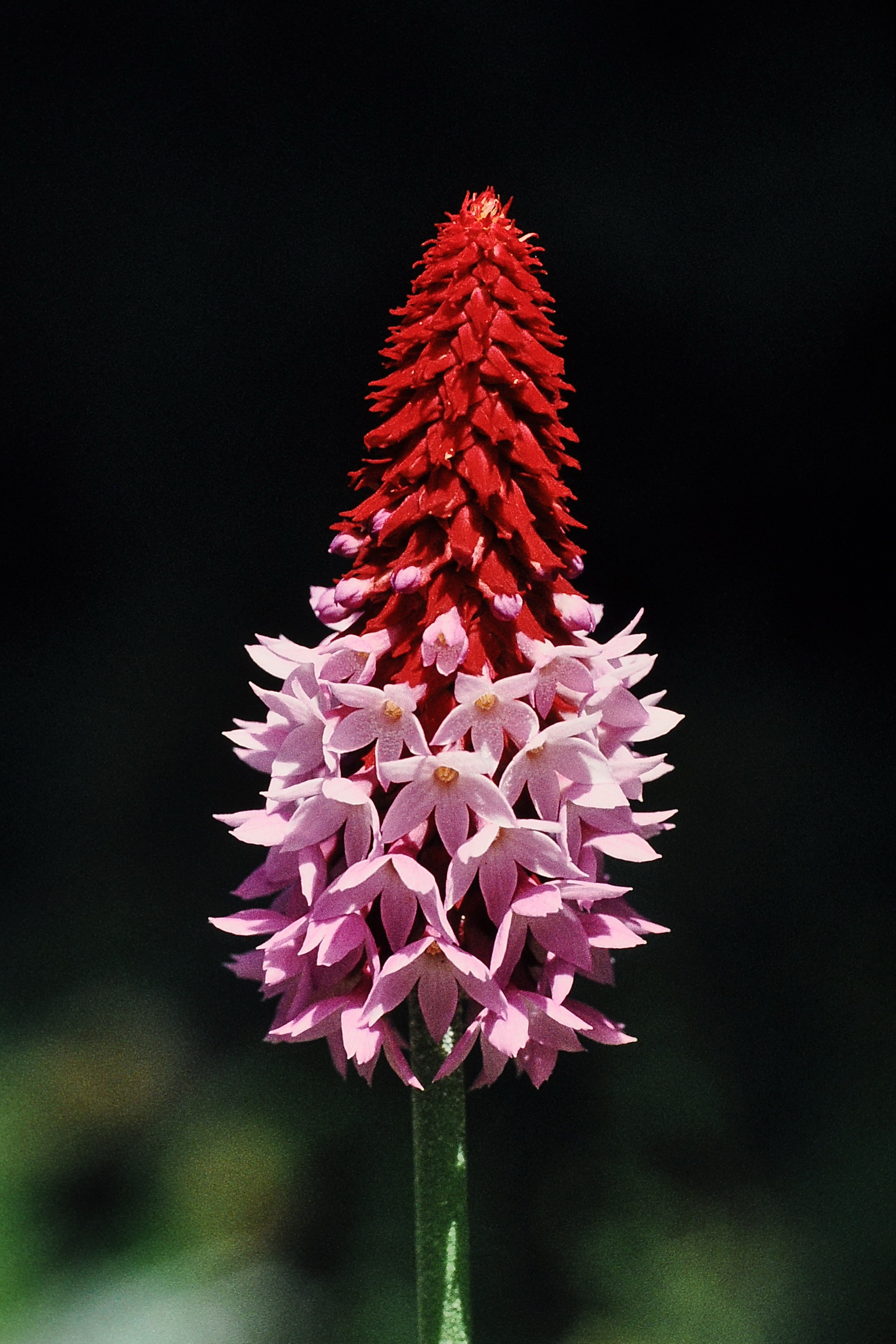

Scientific classification
- Kingdom: Plantae
- Clade: Tracheophytes
- Clade: Angiosperms
- Clade: Eudicots
- Clade: Asterids
- Order: Ericales
- Family: Primulaceae
- Genus: Primula
- Species: P. vialii

Binomial name
- Primula vialii Delavay ex Franch.

= Primula vialii =

Species of flowering plant

Primula vialii, Vial's primrose, is a species of flowering plant in the family Primulaceae, originating from wet meadows, or near water in high valleys of SW Sichuan and northern Yunnan in southern China.

== Description ==
Growing to 40 cm (16 in), it is a herbaceous perennial with erect stalks of flowers growing from basal rosettes of leaves. The flowers initially appear as narrow green spikes turning red and opening pink or violet blossoms from the base upwards, thus giving a striking bicoloured appearance.

== Etymology ==
The Latin specific epithet vialii honours Paul Vial (1855-1917).

== Horticulture ==
This plant is cultivated as a garden ornamental, and has gained the Royal Horticultural Society's Award of Garden Merit.

There is a white flowered cultivar 'Alison Holland', which was discovered by 85-year old amateur gardener John Holland in his wild upland garden in northern England.

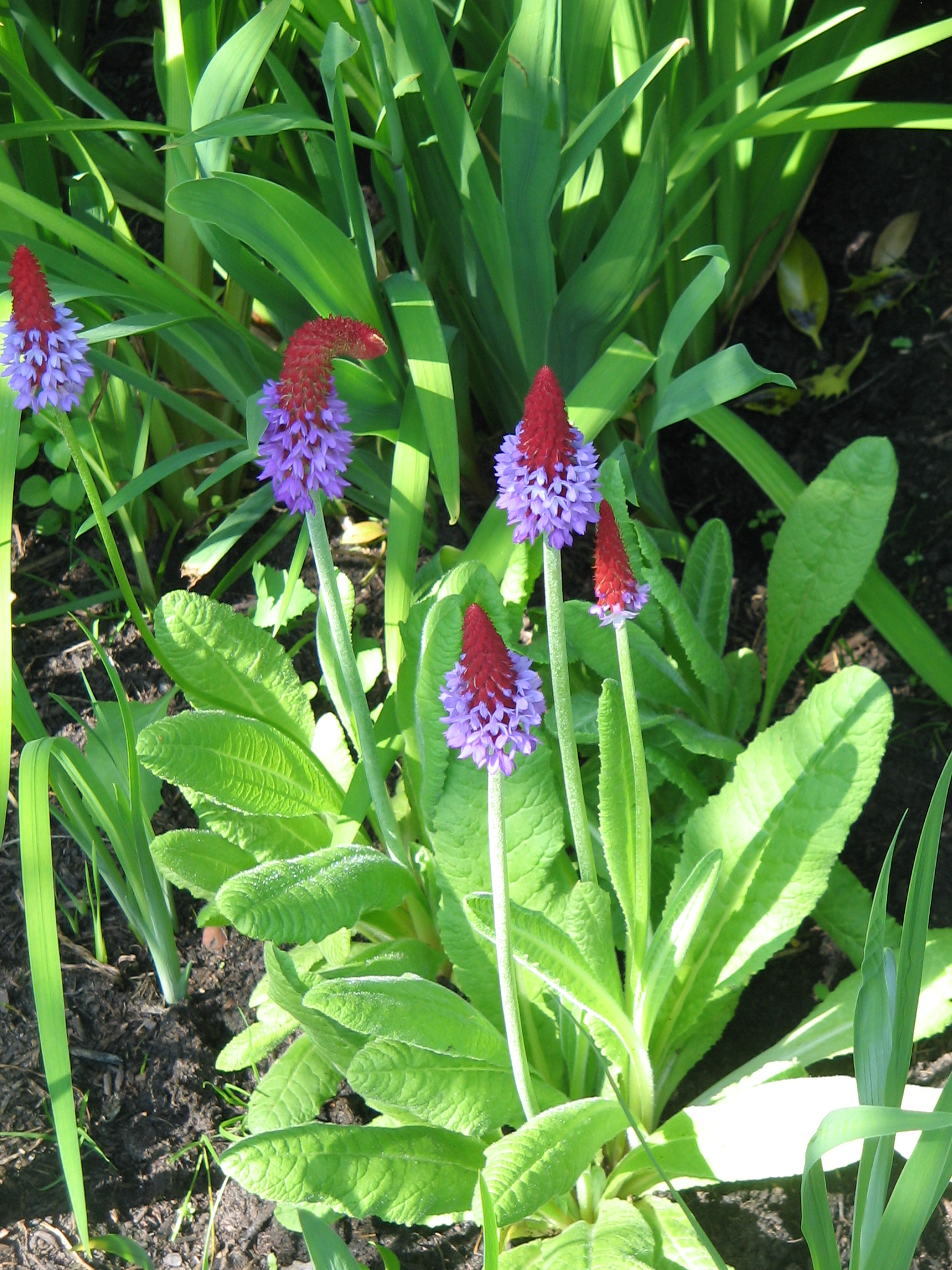

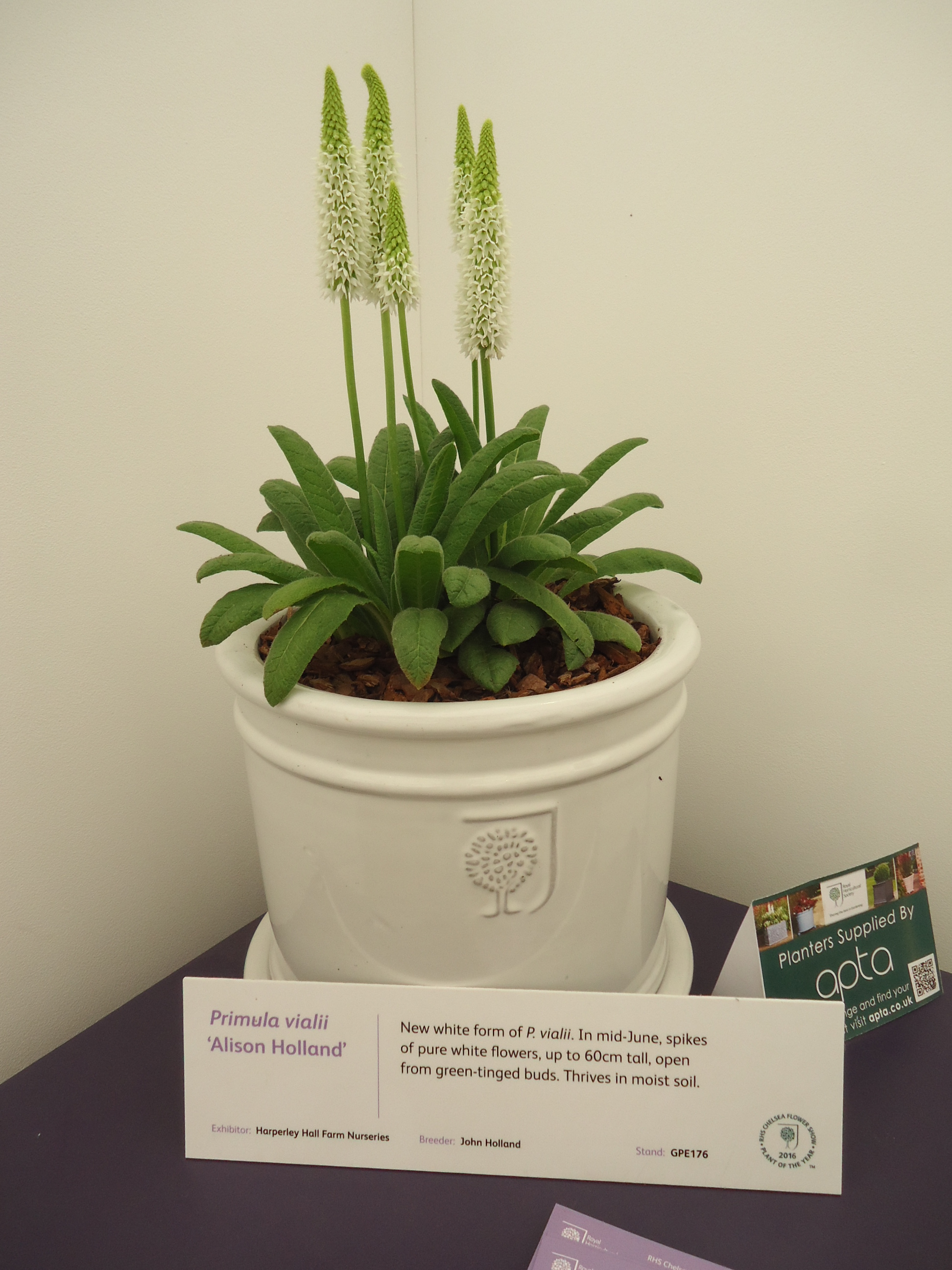
'Alison Holland'
