= Iorwerth Drwyndwn =

12th-century Welsh nobleman

Iorwerth Drwyndwn ab Owain
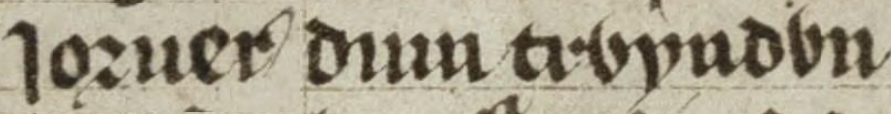
- Iorwerth's name as appears in a copy of Gerald of Wales' Itinerarium Cambriae
- Died: c. 1174
- Burial: Saint Tudglyd's Church, Penmachno
- Spouse: Marared ferch Madog
- Issue: Llywelyn ab Iorwerth
- Dynasty: Second Dynasty of Gwynedd
- Father: Owain Gwynedd
- Mother: Gwladus ferch Llywarch

Iorwerth Drwyndwn ab Owain (Welsh pronunciation: [ˈjɔrwɛrθ ˈdruːɨ̯ndʊn ab ˈoʊain], d. c. 1174) was a Welsh nobleman of the 12th century. He was the son of Owain Gwynedd, king of Gwynedd, and his wife Gwladus ferch Llywarch, a noblewoman of Arwystli who was granddaughter of Trahaearn ap Caradog, once ruler of Gwynedd. This was his father's only legitimate marriage in the eyes of the Church. Little is known of Iorwerth's life or even the origin of Gerald of Wales' nickname for him, trwyndwn 'broken-nose', but he is remembered as the father of Llywelyn ab Iorwerth, prince of Gwynedd. Iorwerth probably held some land in the upper Conwy river valley after the death of his father in 1170, but he is not recorded in any source as having participated in the civil war which gripped Gwynedd following his father's death. Iorwerth probably died about 1174, and his son was thereafter raised in Powys.

== Life ==
Iorwerth was the son of Owain Gwynedd and his wife Gwladus, daughter of Llywarch ap Trahaearn ap Caradog, lord of Arwystli in the 1120s and a staunch ally of Owain and his brother Cadwaladr ap Gruffudd. Gerald of Wales states that Iorwerth was the 'only legitimate son' of Owain Gwynedd, as his brothers Dafydd and Rhodri were born from Owain's canonically invalid marriage with his first cousin Cristin ferch Goronwy. The rest of Owain's numerous male progeny were the product of his relationships with his many mistresses. However, Maelgwn ab Owain Gwynedd was likely also the full brother of Iorwerth Drwyndwn. Maelgwn briefly held Anglesey in the civil war which broke out after Owain's death, but was likely dead before 1177. Gerald may have singled out Iorwerth with the knowledge that between the first writing of his Itinerarium Cambriae in 1191 and its third version in 1214, Iorwerth's son Llywelyn had become master of Gwynedd while Maelgwn died in ignominy without issue.

Gerald also records Iorwerth's nickname, saying Ierverdum Troyndun, quod Kambrice simus sonat, that is, 'Iorwerth Drwyndwn, which in Welsh means flat-nosed.' The nature of this deformity or disfigurement is unknown and Gerald may have expected his audience to possess an understanding of its origin which is now lost to modern readers. The sixteenth-century antiquary Humphrey Llwyd asserted that Iorwerth was "counted unmeete to gouerne bicause of the maime upon his face", though J. E. Lloyd noted that in the Welsh laws, blemishes excluding an heir from succession were only those which would prevent him from undertaking judicial or military duties. It seems unlikely that this disfigurement was why he did not follow Owain to the kingship to Gwynedd, as the poet who sang his elegy still referred to him as 'ruler of Arfon', and Iorwerth secured a very advantageous marriage. Instead, it seems that 'legitimate' and 'illegitimate' children were not distinguished in the succession until Llywelyn ab Iorwerth decided that his younger son Dafydd by his wife Joan, daughter of King John, should succeed him at the expense of his elder illegitimate son Gruffudd.

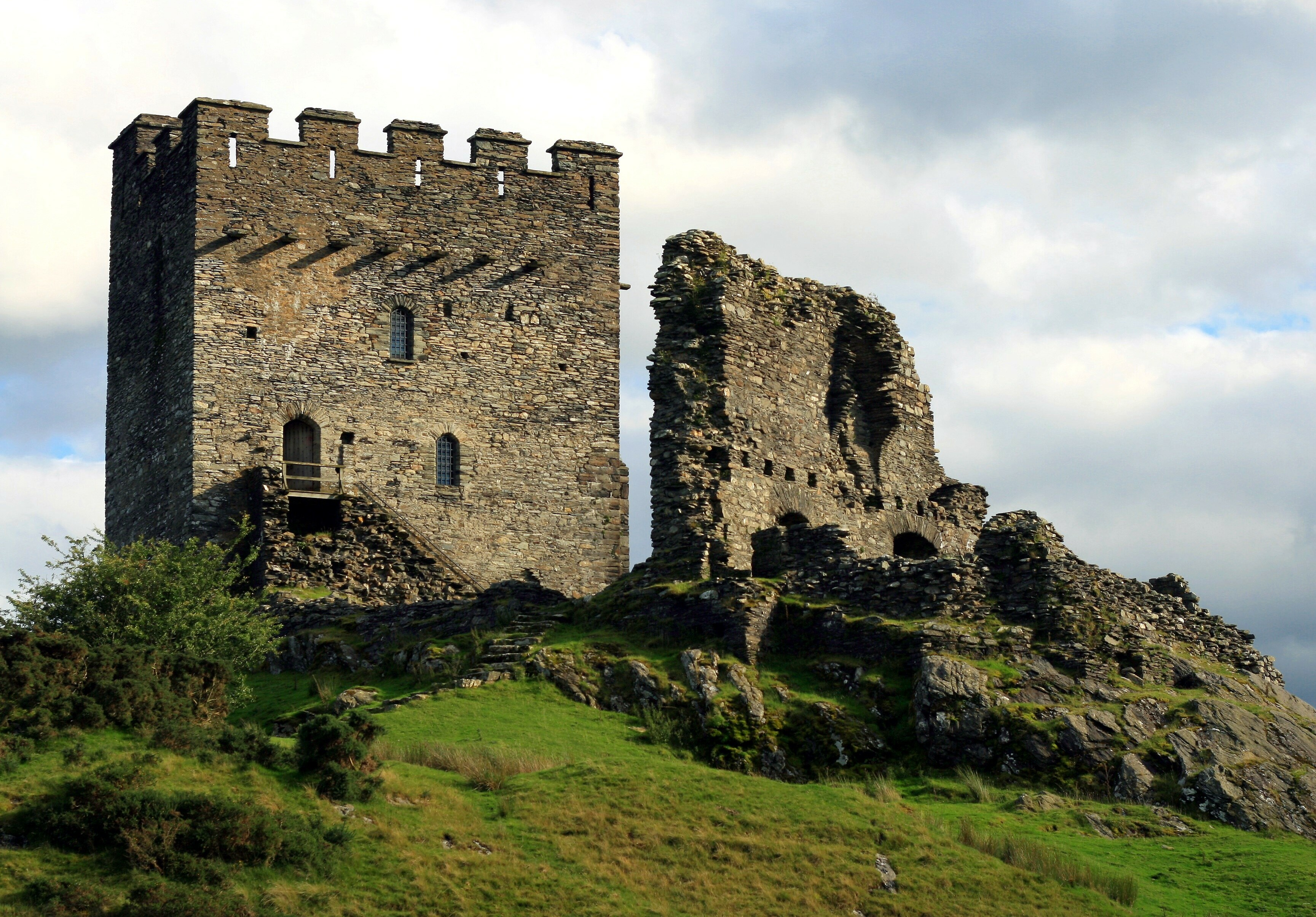
Dolwyddelan Castle from the north

Iorwerth appears in no contemporary historical sources other than Gerald of Wales' work and bardic poetry. He married Marared ferch Madog, a princess of Powys. Lloyd asserts Marared was Iorwerth's first cousin through Susanna, daughter of Gruffudd ap Cynan, though Peter Bartrum does not identify her mother as Susanna in his compilation of medieval Welsh genealogies. After the death of Owain Gwynedd in 1170, Iorwerth appears to have made no move to claim the kingdom of his father. He may have been lord of Nant Conwy, a commote in Arllechwedd. Tradition holds that his son Llywelyn was born in the castle of Dolwyddelan in the commote. The present castle on the site, however, was constructed by Llywelyn ab Iorwerth in the thirteenth century in order to safeguard the passes into Snowdonia. Llywelyn's true birthplace was possibly Tomen Castle just a few hundred metres southeast of the present castle. Llywelyn's birth-year is securely dated to 1173 because it is reckoned at two and a half years after the death of Owain Gwynedd (d. 23 November 1170) in the chronicle known as O Oes Gwrtheyrn Gwrtheneu. It would appear that Iorwerth died under uncertain circumstances in c. 1174 shortly after the birth of his only son, as he is not recorded as having been dispossessed at the hands of Dafydd ab Owain Gwynedd as his other brothers were in 1175-6. The evidence from his elegy further supports this idea, as it states that he was buried in Llandutglyd, the parish church of Penmachno, which is situated in Nant Conwy. After Iorwerth's death, Llywelyn was raised in Powys, likely at the court of Gruffudd Maelor, who was not only Marared's full brother but was also married to Llywelyn's aunt.

== Elegy ==
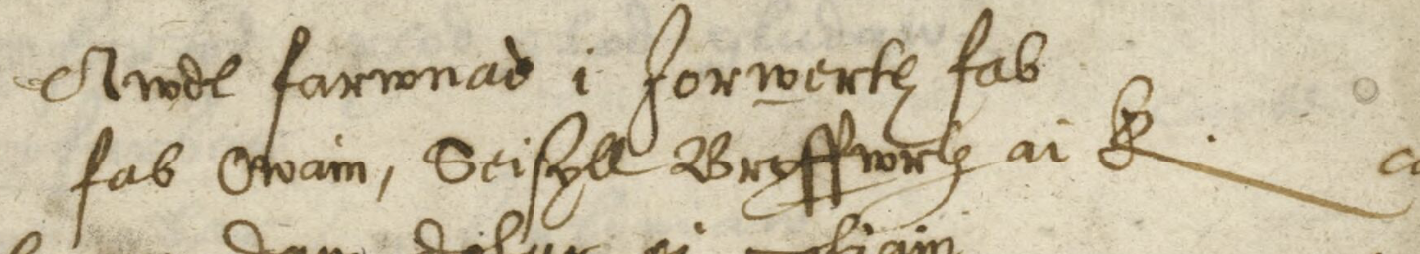
The title of Iorwerth's elegy in John Davies of Mallwyd's Liber B, f. 22^{r}: Awdl farwnad i Iorwerth fab fab (sic) Owain, Seisyll Bryffwrch ai K(ant)

Iorwerth was the recipient of an elegy by the professional praise-poet Seisyll Bryffwrch. It survives in Liber B of John Davies of Mallwyd, which contains a copy of the Hendregadredd Manuscript as was extant in his time. However, the poem was likely originally in Hendregadredd in a folio in the now-lost third quire. Elidir Sais may also have sung to Iorwerth as he recalls his generosity in a praise of Llywelyn ab Iorwerth, though no works by the poet to Iorwerth survive. The poem by Seisyll to Iorwerth Drwyndwn consists of eighteen lines of nine couplets in the metre known as Cyhydedd Fer, which refers to eight-syllable lines with strict cynghanedd. However, lines 9 and 10 are in the variation known as Toddaid Byr, with eleven syllables in line 9 and six in line 10. Likewise, line 5 has nine syllables and 11 and 13 have seven.

Chweddl a'm daw, dolur ei gofiain,
Chweddl dirfawr, dirfarth gyfrwynain,
Chweddl rhyhir, rhyhydr ei ysgain,
Chweddl agarw marw mawrfab Owain
O newydd yn Nehau a Dwyrain,
Yn ormodd, yn armes Prydain.
Llaw-wag cyrdd gwedi câr ddilain,
Llawer cof canthudd a ddichwain.
Ar ôl erbylu cyrdd, nid coelfain—ei ddwyn
Oddyman hyd Rufain,
Can ys marw iôr côr cywrain,
Chweddl mwyfwy, garw dramwy drumain;
I Faig ni bu ddadwyrain,
Bychan budd i fedydd a fain,
Oer, gywasg gywisg pridd a main
Llandutglyd am glod orwyrain,
Rhwyfiadur Dygen, rhad digain,
Rhwyf Arfon, Iorferth fab Owain.

— Seisyll Bryffwrch, 'Marwnad Iorwerth ab Owain'
Translation:

News has come to me, it is painful to remember it,
Immense news, wondrously sad,
News that is too much, too hard to share,
Very painful news is the death of Owain's great son,
Recently in the south and east,
It is too much, it is grief for Britain,
All the bards are empty-handed after the death of a friend,
And many memories offer themselves to them.
After poets weaken, it is not good to bear this news,
From here to Rome,
Because the skilful leader of an army is dead,
Sadder news, horrendous is their walk over hills;
To Maig there is no resurrection,
It will be no good to the lands of Christendom,
[because] the tight and cold shroud of earth and stones
of Llandutglyd is around [one who was] a raiser of praise,
The Lord of Dygen, a kindly and wonderful
Lord of Arfon, lorwerth son of Owain.

— Translation by Einir Jones

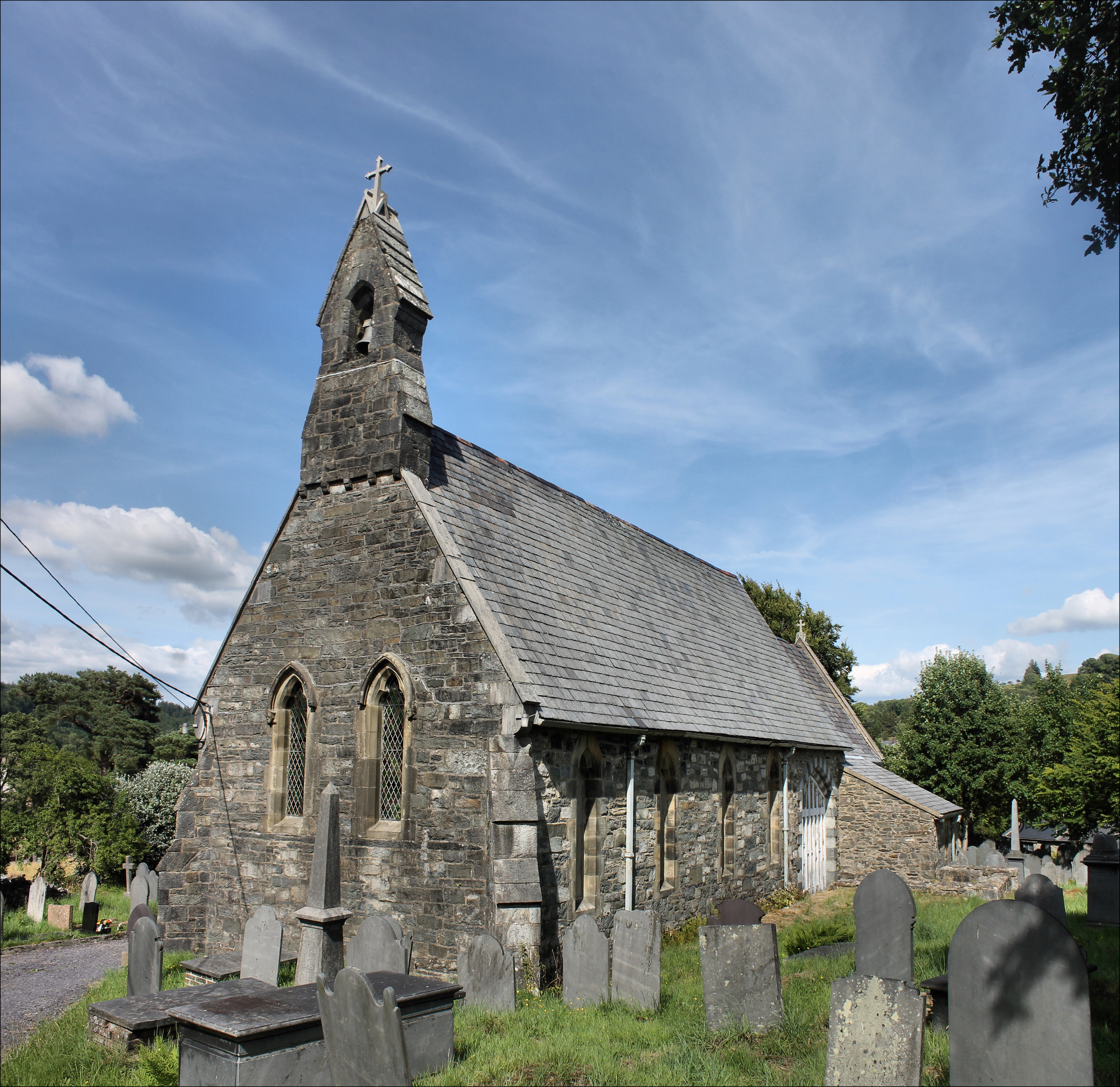
St Tudglyd's Church, Penmachno, in whose churchyard Iorwerth was buried

There is precious little of biographical information given about Iorwerth in the poem. Nevertheless, Iorwerth is connected to his wife's territory of Powys through two references in the poem. He is compared to Maig in line 13, who was a legendary hero and brother of Brochfael Ysgithrog, sixth century king of Powys, and he is called Rhwyfiadur Dygen 'Lord of Dygen' in line 17, with Dygen being either an alternate name for Breidden Hill or a river near it. He is also called Rhwyf Arfon 'Lord of Arfon' in the last line of the poem, though there is no evidence he held this territory and the references to Arfon and Dygen may be instead poetic references to the two furthest westerly and easterly points of North Wales. Likewise, the reference to Rome in line 10 is a stereotypical expression of a long distance in medieval Welsh poetry. Seisyll uses the title iôr to refer to Iorwerth in line 11 as it is the first element of Iorwerth's name, but the reference to armes Prydain in line 6 does not appear to be a reference to the prophecy of the same name, rather armes here is used with the common meaning of the noun meaning 'tribulation, distress, grief'. Lines 15 and 16 confirm where Iorwerth was buried: Llandutglyd, that is, St Tudglyd's Church, Penmachno. The modern church is a Victorian construction, and while it bears no trace of Iorwerth's burial, it does contain six important early medieval inscribed stones.

== Iorwerth and Fouke le Fitz Waryn ==
There is a recurring character named Yervard Droyndoun, le prince de Galles in the Old French chivalric romance Fouke le Fitz Waryn, a poem probably originally versified in the 1260s which has as its protagonist an amalgam of the Marcher barons Fulk I FitzWarin and his grandson Fulk III FitzWarin. In the narrative, Yervard is a repeated ravager of the Marches. However, despite the explicit identification of this character with Iorwerth Drwyndwn, Yervard's actions in the story more closely resemble the career and deeds of Iorwerth Goch ap Maredudd, a prince of Powys and contemporary of Fulk I. This poem also attributes the Royal Badge of Wales to Iorwerth, saying he bears de or e de goules quartyle e en chescun quarter un leopart, 'or and gules quarterly and in each quarter a leopard'. However, despite this explicit attribution of the coat of arms to Iorwerth, it only first contemporaneously appears used by his grandsons Gruffudd and Dafydd ap Llywelyn, and Iorwerth's great-grandson Llywelyn ap Gruffudd also bore these arms during his reign. Therefore, these arms were likely not borne by Iorwerth himself, and may have been projected back onto Iorwerth in Fouke by analogy with those borne by his descendants.

== Ancestry ==
Ancestors of Iorwerth Drwyndwn

16. Iago ab Idwal ap Meurig
8. Cynan ab Iago
17. Afandreg ferch Gwair
4. Gruffudd ap Cynan
18. Amlaíb mac Sitriuc
9. Ragnailt ingen Amlaíb
19. Máelcorcre ingen Dúnlaing
2. Owain Gwynedd
20. Edwin of Tegeingl
10. Owain ab Edwin
21. Iwerydd ferch Cynfyn
5. Angharad ferch Owain ab Edwin
22. Ednywain Bendew
11. Morwyl ferch Ednywain Bendew
1. Iorwerth Drwyndwn
24. Caradog ap Gwyn
12. Trahaearn ap Caradog
25. ?N.N. ferch Gwerystan
6. Llywarch ap Trahaearn
26. Gruffudd ap Llywelyn
13. Nest ferch Gruffudd ap Llywelyn
27. Edith of Mercia
3. Gwladus ferch Llywarch
28. Cadwgon ab Elystan Glodrydd
14. Iorwerth ap Cadwgon
29. Efa ferch Gwrgan
7. Dyddgu ferch Iorwerth

== Arms ==
Coat of arms of Iorwerth Drwyndwn
Notes Doubtfully attributed to Iorwerth in Fouke le Fitz Waryn. Escutcheon Quarterly Or and Gules, four lions passant counter-changed.

== Sources ==
=== Primary sources ===
- Bartrum, P. C., ed. (1976). Welsh Genealogies: AD 300-1400. Cardiff: University of Wales Press. doi:10.20391/40837b6f-1887-4afd-9c6e-9b7e3a122693. ISBN 070830561X. Archived from the original on 6 June 2023.
- Bramley, Kathleen Anne; Owen, Morfydd E., eds. (1994). Gwaith Llywelyn Fardd I ac eraill o feirdd y ddeuddegfed ganrif [The work of Llywelyn Fardd I and other poets of the twelfth century]. Cyfres Beirdd y Tywysogion [Series of the Poets of the Princes] (in Welsh). Vol. 2. University of Wales Press. ISBN 9780708312148.
- Burgess, Glyn S., ed. (1997). Two Medieval Outlaws: Eustace the Monk and Fouke Fitz Waryn. Cambridge: D. S. Brewer. ISBN 0859914380. IA twomedievaloutla0000unse.
- Dimock, James F., ed. (1868). Giraldi Cambrensis Opera (in Latin). Vol. VI. London: Longmans, Green, Reader, and Dyer. IA giraldicambrensi06gira.
- Guy, Ben (2020). Medieval Welsh Genealogy: an Introduction and Textual Study. Woodbridge: Boydell Press. doi:10.1017/9781787448988. ISBN 9781783275137.
- Hathaway, E. J.; Ricketts, P. T.; Robson, C. A.; Wilshere, A. D., eds. (1975). Fouke le Fitz Waryn (in Old French). Oxford: Anglo-Norman Text Society. ISBN 9780631170006.
- Powel, David (1584). The historie of Cambria, now called Wales: a part of the most famous Yland of Brytaine, written in the Brytish language aboue two hundreth yeares past. Translated by Llwyd, Humphrey. London: Rafe Newberrie and Henrie Denham. IA historieofcambri00cara.
- Rhŷs, John; Evans, J. Gwenogvryn, eds. (1890). The text of the Bruts from the Red Book of Hergest (in Middle Welsh). Oxford: Privately printed. IA textofbrutsfromr00rhys.
- Williams, J. E. Caerwyn; Lynch, Peredur, eds. (1994). Gwaith Meilyr Brydydd a'i Digsynyddion [The work of Meilyr Brydydd and his Descendants]. Cyfres Beirdd y Tywysogion [Series of the Poets of the Princes] (in Welsh). Vol. 1. Cardiff: University of Wales Press. ISBN 0708311873.

=== Secondary sources ===
- Andrews, Rhian M.; Stephenson, David (2006). "Draig Argoed: Iorwerth Goch ap Maredudd c. 1110-71". Cambrian Medieval Celtic Studies. 52. CMCS Publications: 65–91.
- Feer, Esther; Jones, Nerys Ann (2005). "The early career of Llywarch Brydydd y Moch". In Fulton, Helen (ed.). Medieval Celtic Literature and Society. Dublin: Four Courts Press. pp. 132–162. ISBN 1851829288.
- Huws, Daniel (2000). Medieval Welsh Manuscripts. Aberystwyth: National Library of Wales. ISBN 0708316026.
- Insley, Charles (2003). "The Wilderness Years of Llywelyn the Great". In Prestwich, Michael C.; Britnell, Richard; Frame, Robin (eds.). Thirteenth Century England IX: Proceedings of the Durham Conference, 2001. Woodbridge: Boydell Press. pp. 163–174. ISBN 9780851155753.
- Jones, Nerys Ann (2003). "Ffynonellau Canu Beirdd y Tywysogion" [Sources of the Poetry of the Poets of the Princes]. Studia Celtica (in Welsh). 44. Cardiff: University of Wales Press: 81–125.
- Lloyd, J. E. (1912). A History of Wales: from the earliest times to the Edwardian conquest. Vol. 2. London: Longmans, Green & Co. IA historyofwalesfr02lloyuoft.
- Pierce, T. Jones (1959a). "IORWERTH DRWYNDWN (The Flat-nosed) (died probably c. 1174), prince of Gwynedd". Dictionary of Welsh Biography. Aberystwyth: National Library of Wales.
  —— (1959b). "MAELGWN ab OWAIN GWYNEDD (died after 1173), prince of Anglesey". Dictionary of Welsh Biography. Aberystwyth: National Library of Wales.
- Siddons, Michael Powell (1991). The Development of Welsh Heraldry. Vol. 1. Aberystwyth: National Library of Wales. ISBN 090715851X.
  —— (1993). The Development of Welsh Heraldry. Vol. 2. Aberystwyth: National Library of Wales. ISBN 090715851X.
- Smith, J. Beverley (1986). "Dynastic Succession in Medieval Wales". Bulletin of the Board of Celtic Studies. 33. University of Wales Press: 199–232.
- Stephenson, David (2005). "The most powerful persons in the land: patterns of power in Arwystli in the twelfth and thirteenth centuries". Montgomeryshire Collections. 93. Powysland Club: 17–36.
- Turvey, Roger (2007). Llywelyn the Great: Prince of Gwynedd. Llandysul: Gomer Press. ISBN 9781843237471.

=== Coflein entries ===
- "Tomen Castell, Dolwyddelan (303046)", Coflein, RCAHMW
- "Dolwyddelan Castle (95299)", Coflein, RCAHMW
- "Six Inscribed Stones in St Tudclud's Church, Penmachno (275728)", Coflein, RCAHMW
