= Rhun =

Rhun may refer to:

== People ==
- Rhun (Welsh given name)
- Rhun ab Arthgal King of Strathclyde c. 870
- Rhun ab Owain Gwynedd (died 1146), son of King Owain Gwynedd
- Rhun ap Maelgwn, or Rhun Hir (died 586), King of Gwynedd
- Rhun ap Iorwerth (born 1972), Welsh politician and journalist
- Rhun Williams (born 1997), Welsh rugby union player

== Other uses ==
- Run (island) or Rhun, one of the Banda Islands, Indonesia
- Rhûn, a fictional region of Middle-earth created by J. R. R. Tolkien
- Prince Rhun, a fictional character in The Chronicles of Prydain

== See also ==
- Caerhun ('Rhun's Fort'), a former civil parish in Conwy, Wales
- King Runo, or Rhun mab Peredur, a legendary king in Geoffrey of Monmouth's Historia Regum Britanniae
- Weston Rhyn, a large village and civil parish in Shropshire, England
