= Loving a Nun =

"Loving a Nun" (Welsh: Caru Lleian), also known as "To the Nun" (Welsh: I'r Lleian), is a medieval poem in the form of a cywydd in which the poet urges a nun to abandon her convent and accept his love. It was until the 1950s generally agreed to be by the great 14th-century poet Dafydd ap Gwilym. The two most recent editors of Dafydd's work excluded this poem, seeing it as the work of an anonymous 15th-century bard, but did not convince all scholars. It has been translated many times, and was included in The Oxford Book of Welsh Verse and The Penguin Book of Welsh Verse.

== Summary ==
The poet loves a pale black-eyed girl, saintly and religious. Will she not give up her monastic life now that it is spring? He invites her to "the cuckoo's church in the woods", to "win heaven in the green grove". God and the saints will forgive her, for

Is it worse for a well-born girl,
to win a soul in the woods
than to do as we have done
in Rome and Compostella?

== Manuscripts ==
The poem survives in 18 manuscripts, none of which is very early. It does not appear in any of the manuscripts of John Davies or Thomas Wiliems, two 16th/17th-century Welsh antiquaries who were diligent in collecting Dafydd ap Gwilym's poems. It is preserved, however, in National Library of Wales MS Llansteffan 47, which has been dated to 1586–1590, and in several manuscripts dating from c. 1600.

== Attribution ==
Every one of the surviving manuscripts either ascribes the poem to Dafydd ap Gwilym or gives it no attribution. It was accepted as genuine in the first published edition of his poems, Barddoniaeth Dafydd ab Gwilym (1789; rev. ed. 1873), and in Sir Ifor Williams' Cywyddau Dafydd ap Gwilym a'i Gyfoeswyr (1914, rev. ed. 1935). When Thomas Parry published his edition, Gwaith Dafydd ap Gwilym (1952), he excluded this poem, arguing that its style was too simple and that it had none of the compound words and parenthesis which characterise Dafydd's work. He nevertheless included it on its own merits in his Oxford Book of Welsh Verse (1962) as an anonymous 15th-century poem. The 2007 edition by Dafydd Johnston and others also excludes this poem from the Dafydd ap Gwilym canon, as have Helen Fulton and other scholars. Nevertheless, since Parry's edition appeared many competent authorities have disagreed with him on this point and would reinstate the poem as a genuine work of Dafydd ap Gwilym.

== Themes ==
"Loving a Nun", like several other late-medieval cywyddau, is a love poem addressed to a nun who has to be won over by the poet so that she will leave the Church for him. It differs from more conventional love songs of the Middle Ages only in that more is at stake, runaways from convents and seducers of nuns both being punishable by excommunication. Helen Fulton has argued that these cywyddau functioned primarily as eulogies to members of the aristocracy who happened to be nuns, just as other love poems praised female members of the secular ruling class, in both cases thereby upholding the values of aristocratic society.

== Modern editions ==
- Parry, Thomas, ed. (1983) [1962]. The Oxford Book of Welsh Verse. Oxford: Oxford University Press. pp. 106–107. ISBN 9780198121299. An edition running to 34 lines.
- Fulton, Helen (Summer 1991). "Medieval Welsh Poems to Nuns". Cambridge Medieval Celtic Studies. 21: 107. A single-manuscript edition of 30 lines.
- Fulton, Helen (1996). Selections from the Dafydd ap Gwilym Apocrypha. Llandysul: Gomer Press. p. 53. ISBN 185902310X. A single-manuscript edition of 30 lines, the text not identical with that of the previous edition.

== Translations and paraphrases ==
- Bell, David, in Bell, H. Idris; Bell, David (1942). Fifty Poems. Y Cymmrodor, vol. 48. London: Honourable Society of Cymmrodorion. pp. 153, 155. With the Middle Welsh original in parallel text.
- Clancy, Joseph P. (1965). Medieval Welsh Lyrics. London: Macmillan. pp. 165–166.
  - Revised version in Clancy, Joseph P. (2003). Medieval Welsh Poems. Dublin: Four Courts Press. pp. 280–281. ISBN 9781851826964.
- Conran, Anthony; Williams, J. E. Caerwyn (1967). The Penguin Book of Welsh Verse. Harmondsworth: Penguin. pp. 160–161.
- Fulton, Helen (Summer 1991). "Medieval Welsh Poems to Nuns". Cambridge Medieval Celtic Studies. 21: 107–108.
  - Revised version in Fulton, Helen (1996). Selections from the Dafydd ap Gwilym Apocrypha. Llandysul: Gomer Press. p. 52. ISBN 185902310X.
- Gruffydd, W. J. (1935). Dafydd ap Gwilym. Caerdydd: Gwasg Prifysgol Cymru. pp. 49, 51. An abridged translation with the Middle Welsh original in parallel text.
- Gurney, Robert, ed. (1969). Bardic Heritage. London: Chatto & Windus. pp. 112–113. ISBN 0701113286.
- [Johnes, Arthur James] (1834). Translations into English Verse from the Poems of Davyth ap Gwilym. London: Henry Hooper. pp. 8–9.
- Lewes, Evelyn (1914). Life and Poems of Dafydd ap Gwilym. London: David Nutt. pp. 34–35.
- Watson, Giles (2014). Dafydd ap Gwilym: Paraphrases and Palimpsests. npp: Lulu. p. 32. ISBN 9781291866803.
- Williams, Gwyn (1950). The Rent That's Due to Love: A Selection of Welsh Poems. London: Poetry London. pp. 33, 35. With the Middle Welsh original in parallel text.
  - Revised version in Williams, Gwyn (1976). To Look for a Word. Llandysul: Gomer Press. p. 79. ISBN 0850883563.
