= TPNW (disambiguation) =

TPNW may refer to:

- Treaty on the Prohibition of Nuclear Weapons, an international treaty prohibiting nuclear weapons, signed in 2017 and entered into force 22 January 2021.
- Tourism Partnership North Wales.
- The Standard Carrier Alpha Code for Triple A Logistics.
