= Owain Gwynedd =

King of Gwynedd from 1137 to 1170

- King of Gwynedd; Rex Wallie / Walliarum rex / Waliarum princeps
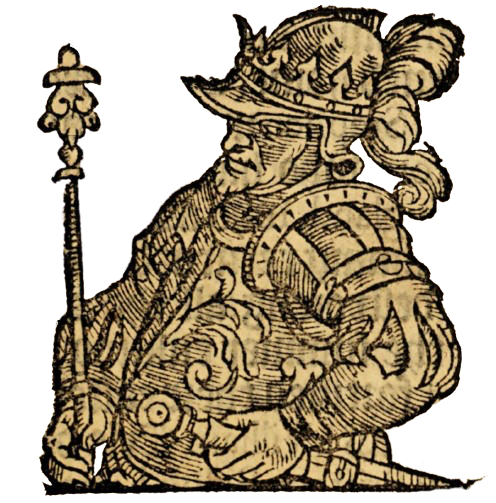
- A fanciful illustration of Owain Gwynedd from the Historie of Cambria (1584)

King of Gwynedd
- Reign: 1137 – 23 November 1170
- Predecessor: Gruffudd ap Cynan
- Successor: Hywel ab Owain Gwynedd

Prince of Wales
- Pretence: c. 1163–23 November 1170
- Successor: Rhys ap Gruffudd
- Died: 23 November 1170
- Burial: Bangor Cathedral
- Spouse: Gwladus ferch Llywarch; Cristin ferch Goronwy
- Issue Detail: Amongst others: Rhun; Hywel; Iorwerth; Maelgwn; Dafydd; Rhodri; Cynan; Madog
- Dynasty: Second Dynasty of Gwynedd
- Father: Gruffudd ap Cynan
- Mother: Angharad ferch Owain

Owain ap Gruffudd (Welsh pronunciation: [ˈoʊain ap 'grɨfɨð], d. 23 November 1170) or Owain Gwynedd (Welsh pronunciation: [ˈoʊain ˈɡwɨnɛð]) was King of Gwynedd from 1137 until his death in 1170, succeeding his father Gruffudd ap Cynan. He is known as Owain Gwynedd to distinguish him from the contemporary Powysian ruler, Owain Cyfeiliog, whose name was also Owain ap Gruffudd. Owain Gwynedd was the first recorded Welsh ruler to style himself king of Wales and Prince of the Welsh.

== Early life ==
Owain Gwynedd was a member of the House of Aberffraw, the senior branch of the dynasty of Rhodri Mawr (Rhodri the Great). His father, Gruffudd ap Cynan, was a strong and long-lived ruler who had made the principality of Gwynedd the most influential in Wales during the sixty-two years of his reign, using the island of Anglesey as his power base. His mother, Angharad ferch Owain, was the daughter of Owain ab Edwin of Tegeingl. Owain Gwynedd was the second son of Gruffudd and Angharad. His elder brother, Cadwallon, was killed in fighting in Powys in 1132 against Meirionnydd.

Owain is thought to have been born on Anglesey about the year 1100, he was Gruffudd ap Cynan's second child, grandchild of Owain ab Edwin of Tegeingl via his mother Angharad ferch Owain. By about 1120 Gruffudd had grown too old to lead his forces in battle and Owain and his brothers Cadwallon and later Cadwaladr led the forces of Gwynedd against the Normans and against other Welsh princes with great success. His elder brother Cadwallon was killed in a battle against the forces of Powys in 1132, leaving Owain as his father's heir. Owain and Cadwaladr, in alliance with Gruffudd ap Rhys of Deheubarth, won a major victory over the Normans at Crug Mawr near Cardigan in 1136 and annexed Ceredigion to their father's realm.

== Accession to the throne and early campaigns ==
On behalf of his father, Gruffudd ap Cynan, Gwynedd directed military operations to the "cantrefs of Meirionnydd, Rhos, Rhufoniog and Dyffryn Clwyd to Gwynedd proper", and it was against the Normans, with Gruffudd ap Rhys he secured a victory at the Battle of Crug Mawr and the temporary occupation of Kingdom of Ceredigion. On Gruffudd's death in 1137, Owain inherited a portion of a well-established kingdom, but had to share it with Cadwaladr. In 1143 Cadwaladr was implicated in the murder of Anarawd ap Gruffudd of Deheubarth, and Owain responded by sending his son Hywel ab Owain Gwynedd to strip him of his lands in the north of Ceredigion. Though Owain was later reconciled with Cadwaladr, from 1143, Owain ruled alone over most of North Wales. In 1155 Cadwaladr was driven into exile.

Owain took advantage of The Anarchy, a civil war between Stephen, King of England, and the Empress Matilda, to push Gwynedd's boundaries further east than ever before. In 1146 he captured Mold Castle and about 1150 captured Rhuddlan and encroached on the borders of Powys. The prince of Powys, Madog ap Maredudd, with assistance from Ranulf de Gernon, 4th Earl of Chester, gave battle at Coleshill, but Owain was victorious.

== War with King Henry II ==
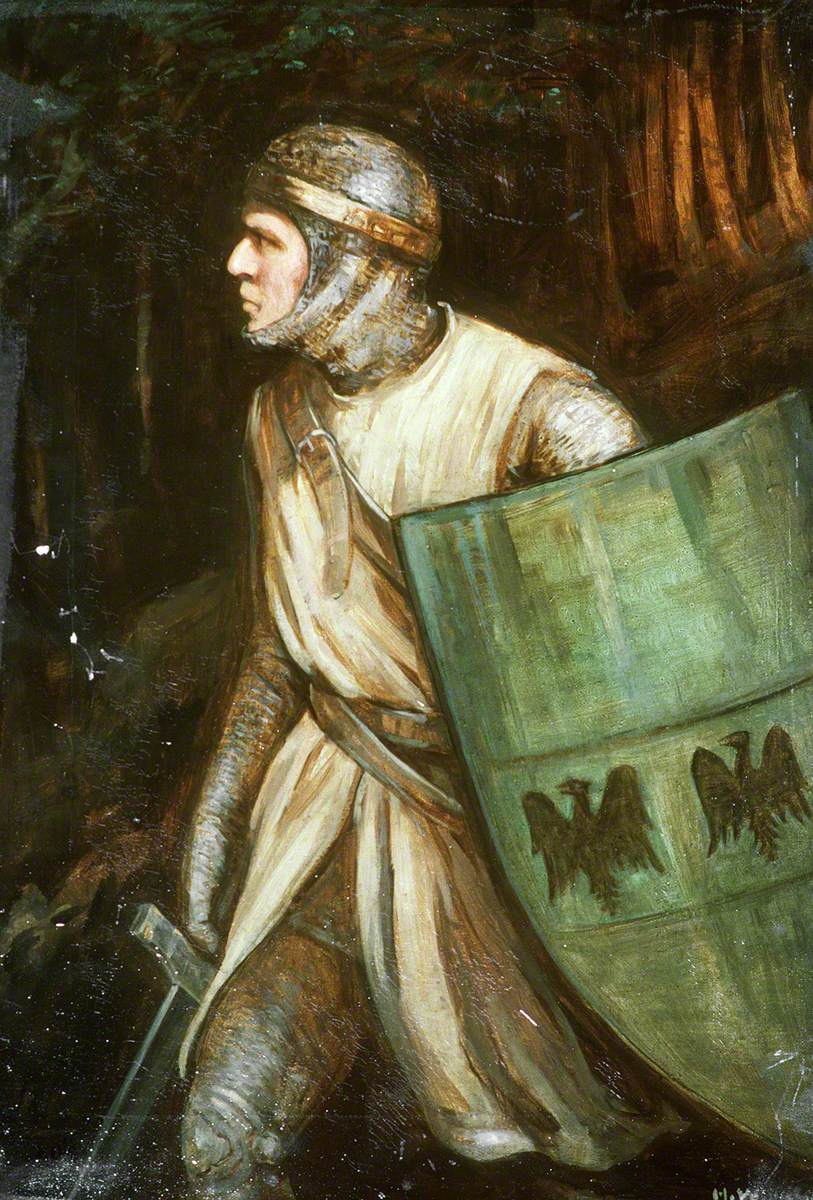
Depiction by Hugh Williams, 1909

King Henry II of England acceded to the throne in 1154, and in 1157 invaded Gwynedd with the support of Madog ap Maredudd of Powys and Owain's brother Cadwaladr. Henry's forces ravaged eastern Gwynedd and destroyed many churches, enraging the local population. The two armies met at Ewloe. Owain's men ambushed the royal army in a narrow, wooded valley, routing it completely with King Henry narrowly avoiding capture. The fleet accompanying the invasion made a landing on Anglesey where it was defeated. Ultimately, at the end of the campaign, Owain was forced to come to terms with Henry, being obliged to surrender Rhuddlan and other conquests in the east.

Madog ap Maredudd died in 1160, enabling Owain to regain territory in the east. In 1163 he formed an alliance with Rhys ap Gruffudd of Deheubarth to challenge English rule. King Henry again invaded Gwynedd in 1165, but instead of taking the usual route along the northern coastal plain, the king's army invaded from Oswestry and took a route over the Berwyn hills. The invasion was met by an alliance of all the Welsh Princes, with Owain as the undisputed leader. However, apart from a small melee at the Battle of Crogen, there was little fighting, for the Welsh weather came to Owain's assistance as torrential rain forced Henry to retreat in disorder. The infuriated Henry mutilated a number of Welsh hostages, including two of Owain's sons.

Owain wrote two letters to Louis VII of France, describing himself as "King of Wales" and "King of the Welsh". In the last of his letters to Louis VII of France, he offered to become a vassal of the French king and assist in attacking Henry if the French would make war on him. This time Owain styled himself Waliarum Princeps (Prince of Wales), (Note: Literally Prince of Waleses, asserting his overlordship over North and South Welsh Kingdoms.) the first time he or anyone is known to have used such a title.

At the time, the word prince, deriving as it did from the Latin princeps, meant "first person, chief leader; ruler, sovereign." It wasn't until the 14th century that it came to mean "heir to the throne". Thus, Owain, by designating himself princeps, was calling himself the principal ruler of Wales.

Henry did not invade Gwynedd again, and Owain was able to regain his eastern conquests, recapturing Rhuddlan Castle in 1167 after a siege of three months.

== Disputes with the church and succession ==
The last years of Owain's life were spent in disputes with the Archbishop of Canterbury, Thomas Becket, over the appointment of a new Bishop of Bangor. When the see became vacant Owain had his nominee, Arthur of Bardsey, elected. The archbishop refused to accept this, so Owain had Arthur consecrated in Ireland. The dispute continued, and the see remained officially vacant until well after Owain's death. He was also put under pressure by the Archbishop and the Pope Alexander III to put aside his second wife, Cristin verch Goronwy, who was his first cousin, this relationship making the marriage invalid under church law. Despite being excommunicated for his defiance, Owain steadfastly refused to put Cristin aside. Owain died in 1170, and despite having been excommunicated was buried in Bangor Cathedral by the local clergy. The annalist writing Brut y Tywysogion recorded his death "after innumerable victories and unconquered from his youth". He was ordered exhumed in 1188 by archbishop Baldwin during his preaching tour of Wales.

He is believed to have commissioned The Life of Gruffudd ap Cynan, an account of his father's life. Following his death, civil war broke out between his sons. Owain was married twice, first to Gwladus ferch Llywarch ap Trahaearn, by whom he had two sons, Maelgwn ab Owain Gwynedd and Iorwerth Drwyndwn, the father of Llywelyn ab Iorwerth (Llywelyn the Great), then to Cristin, by whom he had three sons including Dafydd ab Owain Gwynedd and Rhodri ab Owain Gwynedd. He also had a number of illegitimate sons, who by Welsh law had an equal claim on the inheritance if acknowledged by their father.

== Heirs and successors ==
There is no evidence Owain used a coat of arms during his life, but later antiquarians retroactively attributed to Owain Gwynedd the blazon: Vert, three eagles displayed in fess Or.

Gwynedd was married, firstly to Gwladus daughter of Llywarch ap Trahaearn and then to his first cousin Cristin ferch Goronwy. Owain had originally designated Rhun ab Owain Gwynedd as his successor. Rhun was Owain's favourite son, and his premature death in 1146 plunged his father into a deep melancholy, from which he was only roused by the news that his forces had captured Mold Castle. Owain then designated Hywel ab Owain Gwynedd as his successor, but after his death, Hywel was first driven to seek refuge in Ireland by Cristin's sons, Dafydd and Rhodri, then Hywel was killed at the battle of Pentraeth when he returned with an Irish army. Dafydd and Rhodri split Gwynedd between them, but a generation passed before Gwynedd was restored to its former glory under Owain's grandson Llywelyn ab Iorwerth (Llywelyn the Great).

According to legend, one of Owain's sons was Prince Madoc of Wales (Madog), who is popularly supposed to have fled across the Atlantic and colonised America; this tradition is part of the Pre-Columbian transoceanic contact theories.

Owain Gwynedd is said to have had the following children from two wives and at least four mistresses:

- Rhun ab Owain Gwynedd (illegitimate in Catholic custom, but legitimate successor in Welsh law);
- Hywel ab Owain Gwynedd (illegitimate in Catholic custom, but legitimate successor in Welsh law);
- Iorwerth mab Owain Gwynedd (the "flat nosed" from first wife Gwladys ferch Llywarch);
- Maelgwn ab Owain Gwynedd (from first wife Gwladys ferch Llywarch) Lord of Môn (1169–1173);
- Gwenllian ferch Owain Gwynedd;
- Dafydd ab Owain Gwynedd (from second wife Cristin ferch Goronwy);
- Rhodri ab Owain Gwynedd, Lord of Môn (1175–1193) (from second wife Cristin ferch Goronwy);
- Angharad ferch Owain Gwynedd; married to Gruffudd Maelor I
- Margaret ferch Owain Gwynedd;
- Iefan ab Owain Gwynedd;
- Cynan ab Owain Gwynedd, Lord of Meirionnydd (illegitimate);
- Rhirid ab Owain Gwynedd (illegitimate);
- Madoc ab Owain Gwynedd (illegitimate) (speculative/legendary);
- Cynwrig ab Owain Gwynedd (illegitimate);
- Gwenllian II ferch Owain Gwynedd (also shared the same name with a sister);
- Einion ab Owain Gwynedd (illegitimate);
- Iago ab Owain Gwynedd (illegitimate);
- Ffilip ab Owain Gwynedd (illegitimate);
- Cadell ab Owain Gwynedd (illegitimate);
- Rotpert ab Owain Gwynedd (illegitimate);
- Idwal ab Owain Gwynedd (illegitimate);
- Other daughters.

== Fiction ==
Owain is a recurring character in the Brother Cadfael series of novels by Ellis Peters, often referred to, and appearing in the novels Dead Man's Ransom and The Summer of the Danes. He acts shrewdly to keep Wales' borders secure, and sometimes to expand them, during the civil war between King Stephen and Matilda, and sometimes acts as an ally to Cadfael and his friend, Sheriff Hugh Beringar. Cadwaladr also appears in both these novels as a source of grief for his brother. Owain appears as a minor character in novels of Sharon Kay Penman concerning Henry II and Eleanor of Aquitaine (When Christ and His Saints Slept and Time and Chance). Her focus with respect to Owain is on the fluctuating and fractious relationship between England and Wales.

== Sources ==
- Barbier, Paul (1908). The age of Owain Gwynedd. An attempt at a connected account of the history of Wales from December 1135 to November 1170. Newport, Wales.
- Lloyd, John Edward (2004). A History of Wales: From the Norman Invasion to the Edwardian Conquest. Barnes & Noble. ISBN 978-0-7607-5241-8.
- Penman, Sharon Kay. The Welsh Trilogy. Ballantine Books.
- Powel, David (1584). The historie of Cambria, now called Wales: a part of the most famous Yland of Brytaine, written in the Brytish language aboue two hundreth yeares past. Translated by Llwyd, Humphrey. London: Rafe Newberrie and Henrie Denham. IA historieofcambri00cara.
- Lee, Sidney, ed. (1895). "Owain Gwynedd" . Dictionary of National Biography. Vol. 42. London: Smith, Elder & Co. pp. 391–395.
- Pierce, Thomas Jones (1959). "Owain Gwynedd (c. 1100–1070), King of Gwynedd". Dictionary of Welsh Biography. National Library of Wales.

Owain Gwynedd Second Dynasty of Gwynedd Died: 23 November 1170
Regnal titles
| Preceded by Gruffudd ap Cynan | King of Gwynedd; 1137–1170 | Succeeded by Hywel ab Owain Gwynedd |
