= Seisyll Bryffwrch =

12th-century Welsh poet

- Occupation: Poet
- Years active: 1155–1175

Seisyll Bryffwrch (fl. 1155–1175) was a Welsh-language poet.

Seisyll competed against and was defeated by Cynddelw in a contest for the role of chief court poet to Madog ap Maredudd, prince of Powys.

Seisyll's own compositions include elegies on the death of Owain Gwynedd and of Iorwerth Drwyndwn grandfather and father respectively of Llywelyn ab Iorwerth. Seisyll also wrote poems in praise of the campaigns of the Lord Rhys.
