= The Reckoning (Penman novel) =

1991 novel by Sharon Kay Penman

First edition (publ. Henry Holt)

The Reckoning is a medieval historical novel written by Sharon Kay Penman published in 1991. The plot is of Wales's Llewelyn ap Gruffydd's fight to keep Wales independent of England and of the love story between the Welsh Prince and Eleanor de Montfort. In her writing, Penman presents the nobility of the period and focuses on conflict on various levels from individual conflicts to wars between countries. The novel received generally good reviews.

== Plot outline ==
The Reckoning chronicles the reign of England's King Henry III in Penman's final volume of the series that began with Here Be Dragons. In The Reckoning Penman focuses on the final generation of characters following those presented in the trilogy's previous two novels.

One subplot is the conflict between the Welsh prince Llewelyn ap Gruffydd of Gwynedd—grandson of Llewelyn the Great of Here Be Dragons—and England's King Henry III. In another subplot, Penman chronicles the life and character of Ellen, Simon de Montfort's daughter and Henry III's niece. Prior to his death, the subject of the previous book in the series (Falls the Shadow), Ellen's father negotiated a betrothal to Llewellyn opposed by her cousin Edward, soon to become Edward I of England.

After Henry III dies, Edward imprisons Ellen in the Tower of London, and when she is freed Llewellyn keeps his word and goes through with the marriage. Although the two are separated by years and culture they find happiness which is ruined when Edward declares war against Wales. Ellen dies in childbirth in June 1282 at the royal home Abergwyngregyn, on the north coast of Gwynedd, just a few months after fighting breaks out again in Wales. Her body is carried across the Lafan Sands to the Franciscan Friary of Llanfaes, Anglesey, and a month later the members of her personal household are given safe-conduct to travel to England. The Marcher Lords, as well as Llewelyn's brothers Daffydd and Rhodri are central characters in the political intrigue.

== Writing characteristics ==
Set against a backdrop of political tension, power struggles, war, and hardship, the main characters confront conflict in love, conflict between family members, conflict between one's God, and conflict in friendship, as well as conflicted loyalties between family, self, king and country. A Library Journal review notes Penman's attention to detail in which she "combines an in-depth knowledge of medieval Europe ...re-creating the complex events and emotional drama of the 12th century."

== Reception ==
A July 1991 review of The Reckoning in Publishers Weekly is generally favorable. According to the review, Penman "sustains the reader's interest" and brings a good understanding of medieval life to her fiction though she does "sometimes overwrite, infusing melodrama where the situations themselves make dramatic embellishments excessive."
