= Here Be Dragons =

1985 historical novel by Sharon Kay Penman

- First edition
- Author: Sharon Kay Penman
- Illustrator: Georgia Morrissey
- Language: English
- Genre: Historical fiction
- Publisher: Holt, Rinehart, and Winston
- Publication date: 1985
- Publication place: United States
- Media type: Print (Book)
- Pages: 704
- ISBN: 0-03-062773-7
- Followed by: Falls the Shadow

Here Be Dragons is a historical novel written by Sharon Kay Penman and published in 1985. The novel is the first in a trilogy known as the Welsh Princes series set in medieval England, Wales and France that feature the Plantagenet kings.

== Plot ==
Here Be Dragons is the first of Penman's trilogy about the medieval princes of Gwynedd and the monarchs of England. England's King John uses his out-of-wedlock daughter Joanna as a negotiating tool by marrying her to the Welsh noble Llewelyn to avoid war between England and Wales.

Joanna and Llewelyn's marriage is marred by resentment from Llewelyn's illegitimate son, Gruffydd. Joanna gives birth to two legitimate children, Elen and Dafydd. Growing animosity between the English and Welsh results in Joanna having to act as a diplomatic intermediary between her husband and her father, and the situation deteriorates when Gruffydd is taken hostage by John and narrowly escapes execution. Joanna becomes determined that her own son, Dafydd, will be his father's heir as ruler of Gwynedd, disregarding the Welsh law that all sons should receive equal shares of their father's inheritance. Family disagreements lead Joanna into an affair with William de Braose, who is several years her junior and whom she has met earlier in the story when he was a hostage in Llewelyn's household. Their affair is discovered and William is executed. Joanna is placed in secluded captivity, but at the end of the book Llewelyn comes to find her and offers her forgiveness.

== Style and genre ==
Penman utilizes characters who are in conflict and develops them well. Penman's characterizations are strong, with innocuous historical figures added to the story. She takes the slight historical mention of a character, such as Llewelyn's brother Adda, and adds him to the story, about whom she says, "All we know of Adda is his name." Llewelyn's seneschal Ednyfed Fychan, the forebear of King Henry VII, is important as Llewelyn's trusted friend. Of Fychan, Penman remarks: "I can't recall a time when I didn't know that Ednyfed was the ancestor of Henry Tudor. I assume I must have encountered that fact early in my research. Despite his dubious descendants, I was rather fond of Ednyfed as a character."

Although set in the 12th and 13th centuries, narrative in her novels takes place in medieval sites that still exist and can be visited, including castles, churches and archeological areas. Areas such as Aber Falls and Dolwyddelan Castle have important scenes in Here Be Dragons. The possible remains of the Palace have recently been excavated in Abergwyngregyn.

In a discussion about teaching with historical fiction, scholars Alun Hicks and Dave Martin note that Penman is careful to make the details of her novel reflect the needs of the genre, talking about objects and practices which give the reader historical immersion.

== Themes ==
Penman juxtaposes the central love story between Joanna and Llewelyn the Great against a tapestry of medieval conventions, wars for territory, and the conflict between Llewelyn's fight to maintain an independent Wales and to appease the English King John. Of her research and characterization of Joanna, Penman explains: "All we know about Joanna ... are the bedrock facts about her life. I took those facts and did my best to breathe life into them, seeking to create a woman who would have acted as we know she did. ... Joanna is a rare exception, a woman who made an impact upon her times and who is still remembered today in Wales as Llewelyn's Siwan." In the early 1980s, Penman moved to the Welsh mountains to conduct research for the novel.

In particular, Penman's characters are strong individuals, sometimes, as some reviewers pointed out, too strong. However, Rhian Piprell looks to Penman's treatment of Joan as a reminder that the idea of women wielding power and being influential is not a something unique to the modern world.

Penman explains in an interview: "I think Dragons ... was virgin territory for most readers. The saga of the Plantagenets was much better known, but not many people were familiar with medieval Wales or its princes. And then, too, the story of Llewelyn and Joanna, King John’s illegitimate daughter, is a remarkable one, which struck an emotional chord with many readers."

== Reception ==
One critic wrote of Here Be Dragons that although it is a "good solid book" the 700 page read "lacks magic". The review in Library Journal cautions readers about the book's slow start, and confusing use of names, but concedes the novel is "involving" and "enjoyable". Moreover, the reviewer believes Joanna's character lacks depth, but other characters "are bigger than life." New York Times Book Review was critical of list-like story telling which is too "brisk" and a tendency for tropes which slow the reader down too much. Other reviews are positive. For example, School Library Review claims Here Be Dragons "keeps readers enthralled," and that the novel is a "wonderful melange of historical fiction." A Publishers Weekly review of one of Penman's subsequent books, describes Penman's writing as a "magnificent combination of history and humanity that Penman's readers have come to expect again animates her latest work (after Here Be Dragons)".

== Publication history ==
Here Be Dragons was initially published in 1985 by Holt, Rinehart, and Winston and a year later in the United Kingdom by Collins. In the UK a paperback edition was released in 1986, published by Fontana. In August 1987 Avon Books issued a paperback edition. In 1991 Penguin reissued a paperback edition. In May 2008 Macmillan reissued a trade paperback in the United States.

== Legacy ==
Here Be Dragons, along with the subsequent novels Falls the Shadow and The Reckoning, inspired a sightseeing trail backed by the Tourism Partnership North Wales. The "Penman Trail", as it has been dubbed, visits locations which feature prominently in the books, including Dolwyddelan Castle and Abergwyngregyn.
