= Dolwyddelan Castle =

13th-century castle in North Wales

- Castell Dolwyddelan (Welsh) (Note: Since 2024, Cadw, who manage the site, use the Welsh name only.)
- Dolwyddelan, Conwy County Borough, Wales
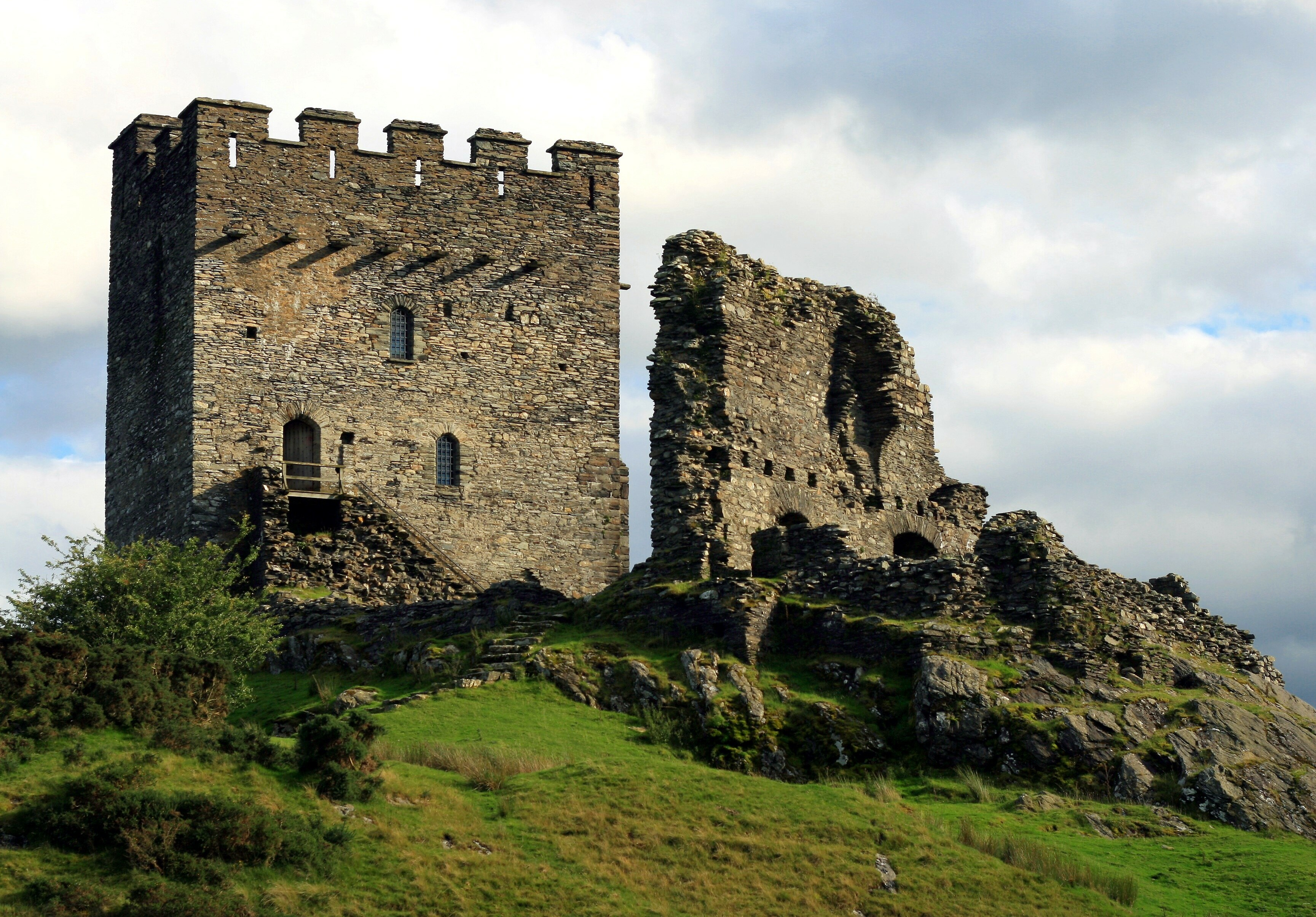
- The castle from the north

Site information
- Controlled by: Cadw
- Condition: Partially ruinous
- Website: Castell Dolwyddelan (Cadw)

Location
- Location in Wales
- Coordinates: 53°03′11″N 03°54′30″W

Site history
- Built: c. 1210 – c. 1240
- Built by: Llywelyn ab Iorwerth
- In use: c. 1210 – after 1488
- Materials: Local grit and slate rubble
- Battles/wars: Conquest of Wales by Edward I

Scheduled monument
- Official name: Castell Dolwyddelan
- Reference no.: CN040

Listed Building – Grade I
- Official name: Dolwyddelan Castle
- Designated: 17 February 1997
- Reference no.: 18253

Dolwyddelan Castle (/dɒlwɪðˈɛlæn/ dol-with-EL-an; Welsh: Castell Dolwyddelan; Welsh pronunciation: [kastɛɬ dɔlwɪð’ɛlan]) is a thirteenth-century castle located west of Dolwyddelan in Conwy County Borough, Wales. Tomen Castell, a late twelfth-century tower, is located south-east of the castle.

Dolwyddelan Castle was probably begun by Llywelyn ab Iorwerth, the ruler of the Kingdom of Gwynedd, between 1210 and 1240 to defend an east–west route within the kingdom. It superseded Tomen Castell, a small tower possibly built by Llywelyn's father, Iorwerth Drwyndwn. Dolwyddelan was captured by Edward I of England in 1283, and despite being immediately refortified its military significance subsequently declined. In 1488 Maredudd ab Ieuan, a member of a family from neighbouring Eifionydd, purchased the lease and repaired the structure, but it was ruinous by the mid-nineteenth century. Between 1848 and 1850 the keep was restored and reconstructed by Peter Drummond-Burrell, 22nd Baron Willoughby de Eresby, and in 1930 the castle was placed in state care; it is currently managed by Cadw, the Welsh Government's historic environment service, and open to the public. It was designated a grade I listed building in 1997 and is a scheduled monument.

The castle is built on a small knoll and consists of a keep on the east side and a tower on the west, linked by walls to form a roughly circular enclosure. The building history is uncertain, but the keep is the oldest structure. It has been heightened twice, first by either Edward I or Maredudd ab Ieuan and second during the nineteenth-century restoration. The western tower may have been constructed in the late thirteenth century by Llywelyn ap Gruffudd or shortly after the English capture of the castle.

== Early history ==
The fragmentary remains of Tomen Castell, a small tower, stand on a rocky outcrop between the later castle and the Afon Lledr. The tower predates Dolwyddelan Castle and is the likely birthplace of Llywelyn ab Iorwerth, prince of Gwynedd and Wales, despite a tradition that the prince was born in the castle. Tomen Castell may have been built by Iorwerth Drwyndwn, the father of Llywelyn and eldest son of Owain Gwynedd, to assert his authority in the period of unrest after the death of the latter in 1170. At the summit of the outcrop are the remains of the small rectangular tower, which has outer dimensions of approximately 8.8 by 9.5 m (29 by 31 ft) and walls approximately 2.3–2.95 m (7 ft 7 in – 9 ft 8 in) thick. The outcrop falls away steeply to the north, east, and south, and was defended by a ditch on the west where the ground is less precipitous. It was replaced by the current castle.

Dolwyddelan Castle was probably built by Llywelyn ab Iorwerth between 1210 and 1240 in order to guard the road from Nant Conwy to Meirionydd, which at that time ran along the valley side and passed close to the west of the castle. (Note: Merionydd was a cantref and Nant Conwy a commote. When the castle was built the government of Gwynedd was organised hierarchically. Cantrefi were the largest unit of government and were theoretically subdivided into two cymydau (commotes), which were themselves divided into twelve maenolau (territorial lordships) each containing four trefi (townships). Each commote also contained a maerdref, or royal manorial centre, and hafodydd, royal summer cow-pastures. In the commote of Nant Conwy the maerdref was at Trefriw and the hafodydd in the Lledr valley around Dolwyddelan.) The castle was built at Ffriddgelli, one of the ten hafodydd, or summer cattle grazing pastures, which belonged to the princes of Gwynedd in the Lledr valley. The rectangular keep is typical of those constructed by the Welsh princes in the thirteenth century, and bears a resemblance to the contemporary towers built by Llywelyn at Castell y Bere and Criccieth. (Note: Llywelyn ab Iorwerth also began the castles at Dolbadarn and Deganwy and may have built Cardonchan, Cwm Prysor, and Ewloe, although the last is more likely to be the work of his grandson, Llywelyn ap Gruffudd.) The keep was initially freestanding, but the curtain wall was built by Llywelyn soon afterwards.

It is uncertain when the west tower at Dolwyddelan was constructed, but it was certainly built after the curtain wall and the surviving dressed stone suggests a late thirteenth or early fourteenth century date. It likely replaced an earlier building, as at this point the curtain incorporates two latrine chutes which are contemporary with it. The tower may have been built by Llywelyn ap Gruffudd, the grandson of Llywelyn ab Iorwerth, who constructed similar towers at Criccieth and Dolforwyn. (Note: Llywelyn ap Gruffudd is known to have stayed at Dolwyddelan as in August 1275 he sent a letter to the prior of Valle Crucis Abbey from the castle.) Alternatively, it may have been erected after the capture of the castle by Edward I's forces on 18 January 1283, as a surviving account from the same year mentions the construction of a camera (lodging) at Dolwyddelan.

The siege which brought the castle under English control did not last long and it is possible that the constable negotiated a surrender. The castle was immediately refortified, supplied with a siege engine built at Betws-y-Coed, and occupied by an English garrison which was supplied with white material from Ireland and white stockings to use as winter camouflage. Between 1283 and 1292 the castle was repaired and a new bridge and water mill constructed in the valley. English troops maintained a military presence at the castle until at least 1290, when Gruffudd ap Tudur, the Welsh constable appointed in 1284, was still in office.

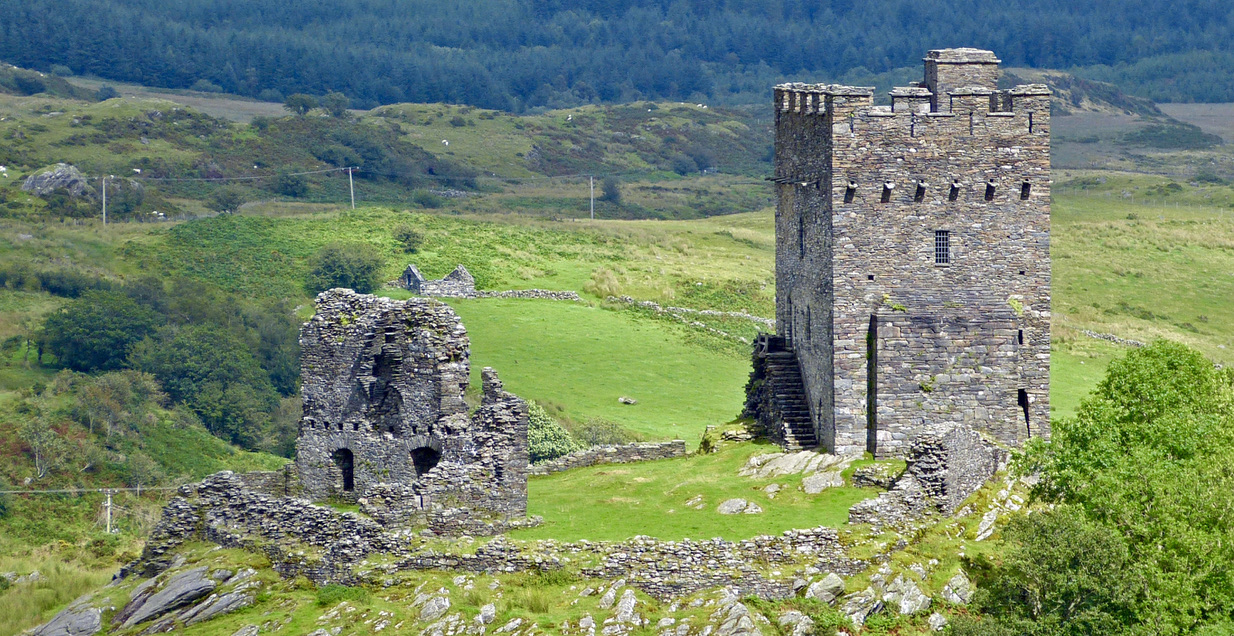
The castle from the west. The keep is on the right and the west tower on the left, with the curtain walls between the two. The remains of the west tower's first-floor fireplace are visible.

== Later history ==
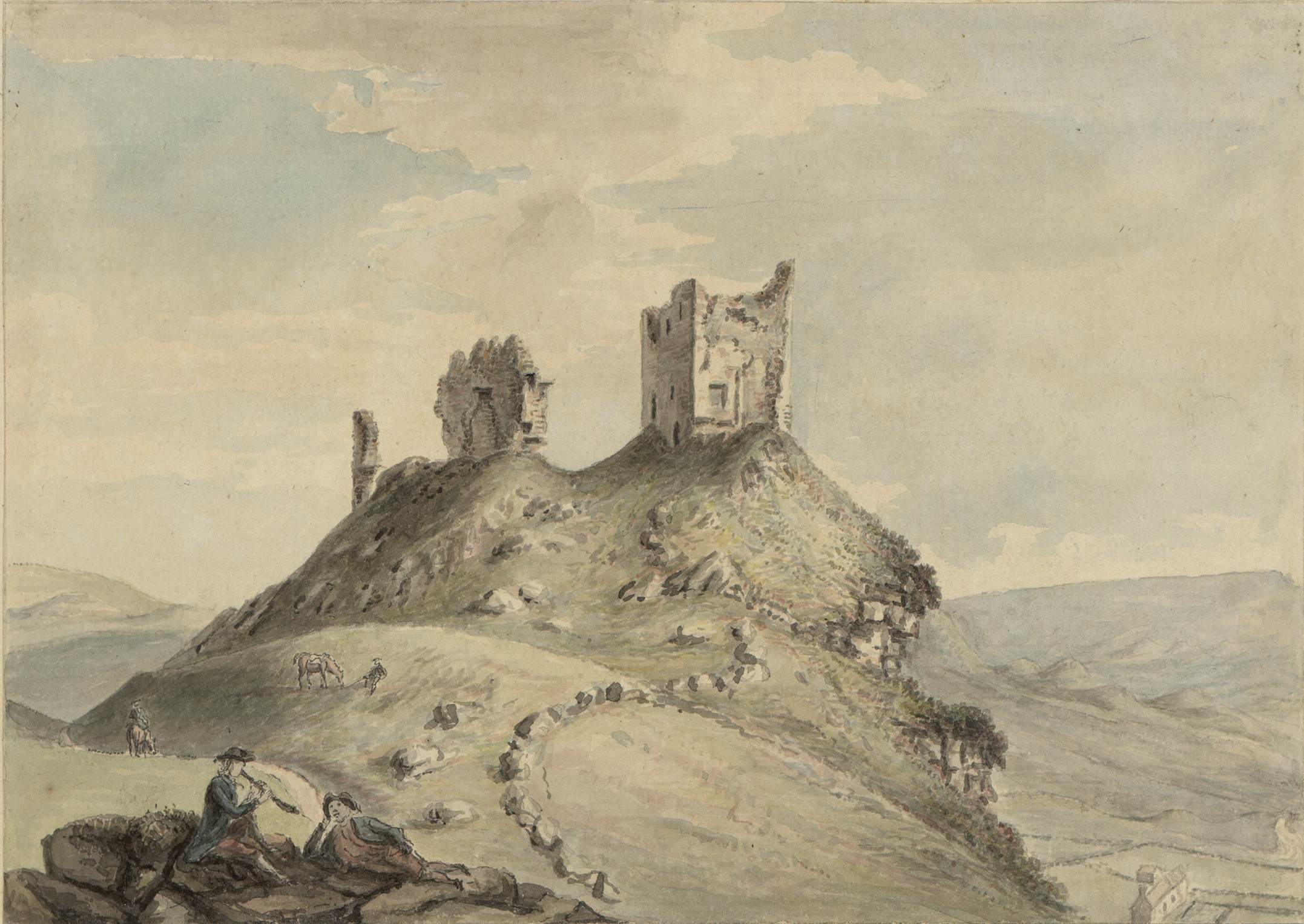
Dolwyddelan Castle c. 1778, from Thomas Pennant's A Tour in Wales

Little appears to have happened at the castle between the end of the thirteenth century and 1488, when the lease was acquired by Maredudd ab Ieuan. According to the History of the Gwydir Family, compiled by his descendant Sir John Wynn, 1st baronet between 1590 and 1614, Maredudd was a member of a family from the commote of Eifionydd which was notorious for kindred feuds, and he moved to Dolwyddelan to both extend his influence and distance himself from his relatives.

The castle at this time was partly habitable, as it had shortly before been occupied by Hywel ab Ieuan ap Rhys, a "captain" and "outlaw". The country surrounding Dolwyddelan was unruly, and although Maredudd built a new house nearby, Tai Penamnen, he may have valued the castle as a secure residence. It is possible that he heightened the keep, but Richard Avent considers it more probable that this work was undertaken by Edward I and that Maredudd instead preferred the spacious chambers in the west tower. Dolwyddelan became part of the Gwydir estate when Maredudd purchased Gwydir Castle c. 1515, and remained so until being sold in 1895.

In the eighteenth and nineteenth centuries the now-ruined castle attracted the attention of artists and antiquarians. It was engraved by Samuel and Nathaniel Buck in 1742 and painted in 1788 by Moses Griffith for inclusion in Thomas Pennant's A Tour in Wales, which includes a description and history of the castle. An account of the castle given in 1816 by the artist Edward Pugh in his Cambria Depicta suggests that one of the towers collapsed around 1810. It is possible that a rough sketch from 1799 by J. M. W. Turner also depicts the castle. These accounts are valuable as they record the castle before it was partially restored and reconstructed by Lord Willoughby de Eresby, a distant descendant of Maredudd ab Ieuan, between 1848 and 1850. This work included raising the keep to its current height and adding the battlements. Dolwyddelan was placed under the guardianship of the Ministry of Works in 1930 and is now managed by Cadw. The castle is both a scheduled monument and grade I listed building, and is open to the public. In 1980 the castle was used as a location for the film Dragonslayer. Since 2024, Cadw have used the Welsh name "Castell Dolwyddelan" in English.

== Architecture ==
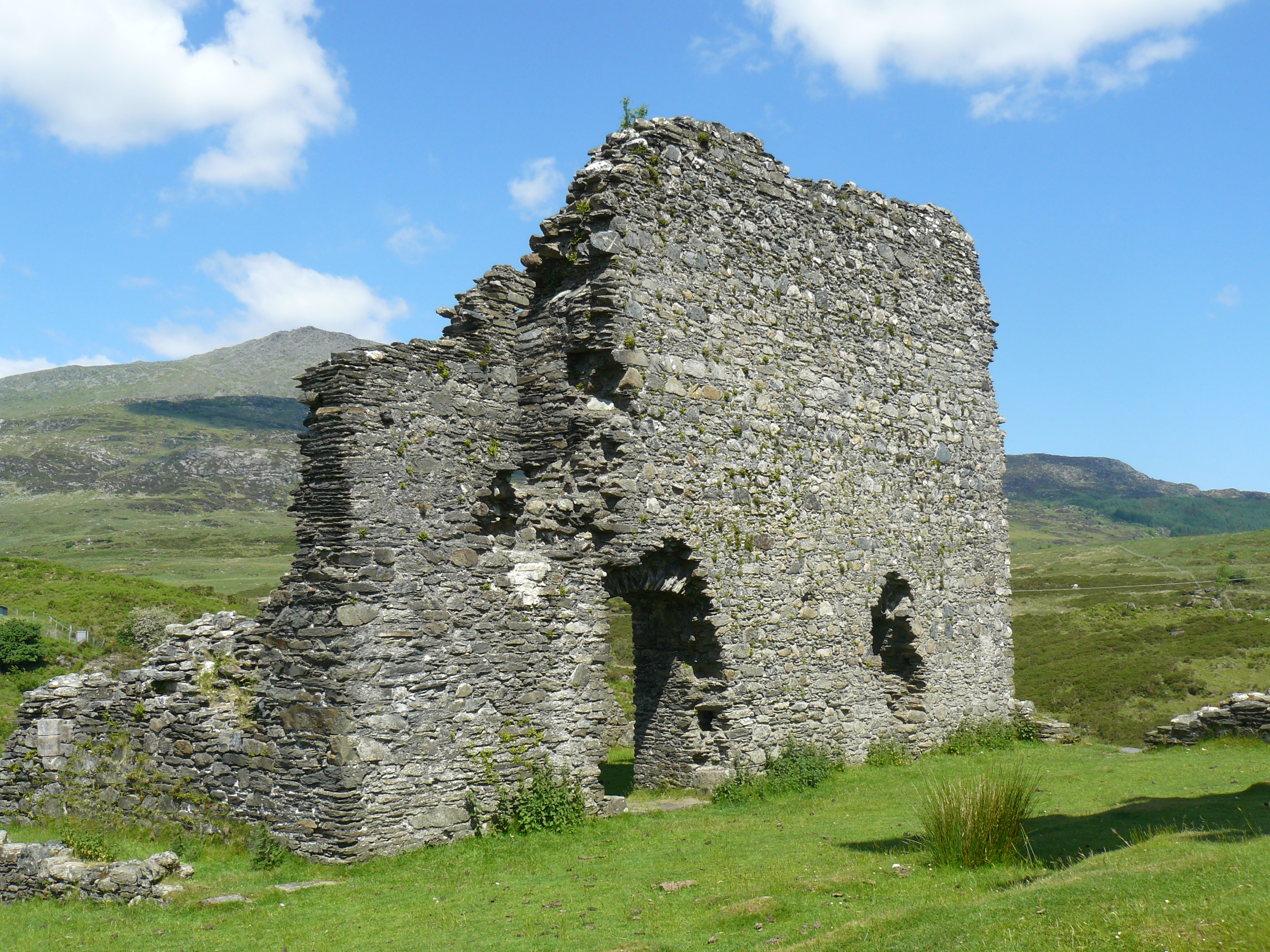
The west tower from the courtyard, looking north-east

Dolwyddelan Castle forms a roughly circular enclosure around the knoll it occupies, and is constructed of local grit and slate rubble. The keep is the oldest part of the castle and consists of a basement with two storeys above. By the mid-nineteenth century it was ruined, with a large v-shaped area of masonry missing from the northern wall. The keep was extensively restored and rebuilt between 1848 and 1850 by Lord Willoughby de Eresby. The work included reconstructing the uppermost part of the keep, including the fake drains which project from the wall and the battlements; renewing the existing doors and windows; inserting windows into the second storey; and extensive reconstruction of the north and south walls, including the latrine extension which projects from the latter.

The entrance to the tower is on the first floor via a flight of steps which was originally protected by a forebuilding, now ruinous. The interior is currently a two-storey space, but would originally have consisted of only the first floor. The line of the original gable is preserved in the south wall, and the side walls have an offset which would have supported the roof timbers. The fireplace in the east wall has a thirteenth-century back but otherwise dates from the restoration. The window embrasure to the left of the fireplace contains an entrance to a stair contained within the thickness of the wall, which leads to the roof. There is no evidence of a second-floor door from this stair, although the nineteenth-century rebuilding may have obscured the existence of one. As the second-floor windows also date from this reconstruction it is possible that the tower was heightened without a new floor being inserted.

The west tower is ruinous, but originally consisted of two storeys with a single chamber on each floor. Its east and north sides incorporate the original curtain wall and two latrine chutes in the north-east corner. The east wall is approximately 7.9 m (26 ft) high and contains evidence of a door and window on the ground floor and a fireplace with a hood on the first floor. The bottom half of a narrow window survives in the south wall; its dressings, as well as those of the surviving doorway jambs, are similar to those used at Conwy Castle, which was built by Edward I. The window was blocked in the fifteenth century, when an external staircase was built against the south wall to provide access to the curtain wall. There is no evidence of an internal stair and, if one existed, it may have been made of timber.

The curtain wall encloses the space between the two towers. There was no gatehouse and the main entrance was a simple gateway in the north-east wall. This was probably reached by a wooden bridge across the rock-cut ditch on this side of the castle; there is another ditch on the south-western side of the knoll. The highest surviving portion of curtain is to the south of the keep and reaches a height of 4 m (13 ft); the wall has a maximum thickness of 2 m (6 ft). The southern corner between the keep and curtain wall contains the remains of an oven, and may mark the site of the kitchens. The curtain also contains the remains of a postern gate in the north-east corner.

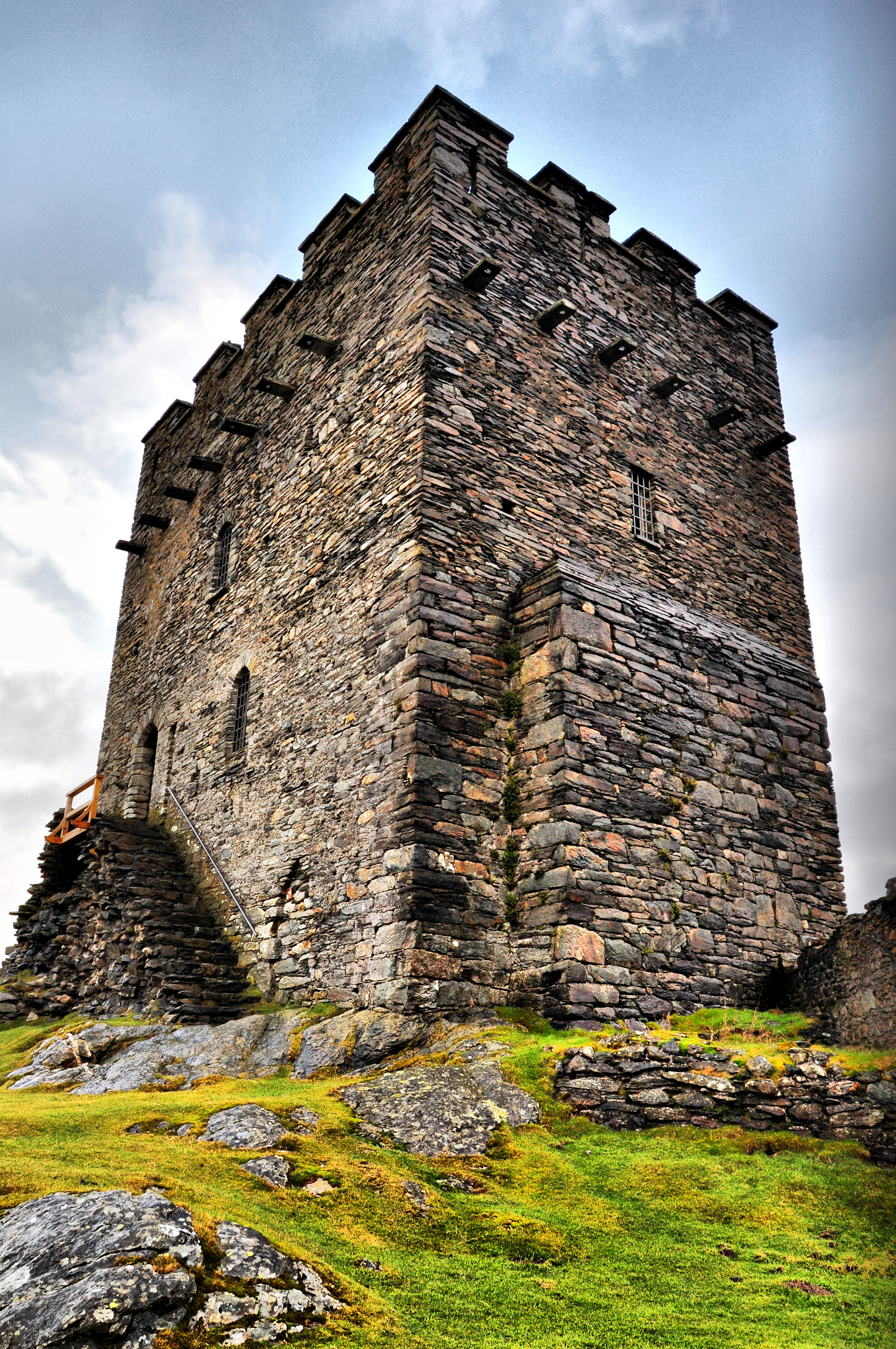
The exterior of the keep showing the remains of the forebuilding and the rebuilt south wall and battlements

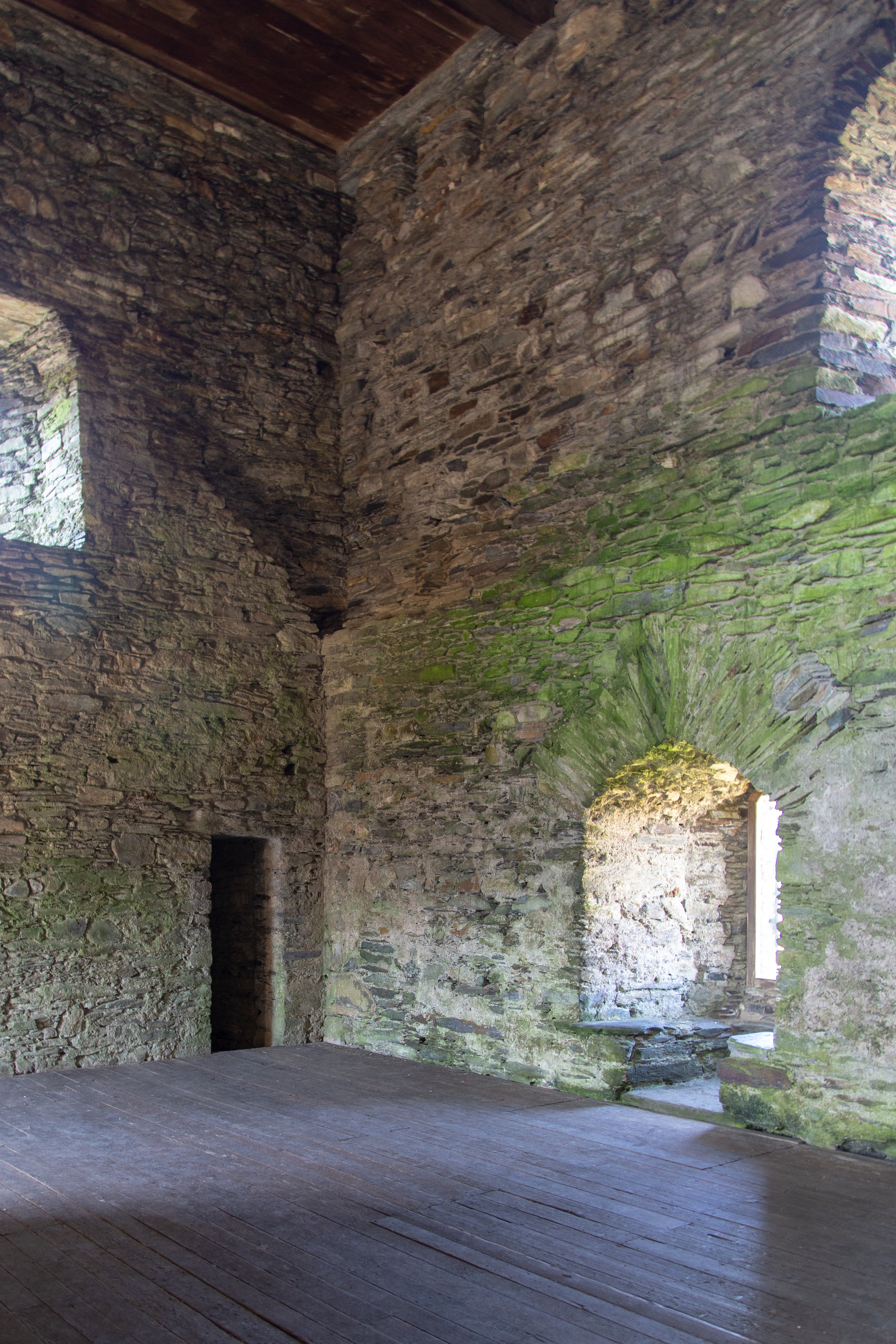
The keep interior looking south-west; the line of the original roof is visible above the doorway.

== See also ==
- Castles in Great Britain and Ireland
- List of castles in Wales
