= Angharad ferch Owain =

Queen of Gwynedd

- Queen of Gwynedd
- Died: 1162
- Spouse: Gruffudd ap Cynan
- Issue: Cadwallon, Owain Gwynedd, Cadwaladr, Susanna, Gwenllian
- Father: Owain ab Edwin
- Mother: Morwyl ferch Ednywain Bendew

Angharad ferch Owain (1065 - 1162) was a Queen of Gwynedd and wife of Gruffudd ap Cynan.

== Biography ==
Angharad's father was Owain ab Edwin, a prominent landowner in eastern Gwynedd and the holder of Tegeingl, and her mother was Morwyl ferch Ednywain Bendew. Angharad married Gruffudd ap Cynan, the king of Gwynedd (and her sixth cousin once removed), around 1095. They had three sons: Cadwallon (who died in 1132, before his father), Owain Gwynedd, and Cadwaladr. They also had five daughters: Gwenllian, Marared, Rainillt, Susanna, and Annest. Angharad outlived Gruffudd, who left her the port and ferry of Abermenai, two rhandir (land shares), and half of his goods. Angharad died twenty-five years after her husband, in the year 1162.

== Legacy ==
Angharad was recorded by Gruffudd's court biographer in a positive light. Her beauty and blonde hair were noted, as were her eloquence and generosity to the people of the land and to charity for the poor.
