= The Sunne in Splendour =

1982 historical novel by Sharon Kay Penman

First edition (publ. Henry Holt)

The Sunne in Splendour is a historical novel written by Sharon Kay Penman. Penman became interested in the subject of Richard III while a student and wrote a manuscript that was stolen from her car. She rewrote the manuscript, which was published in 1982.

== Background ==
As a student, Penman researched and wrote The Sunne in Splendour, which chronicled the life of Richard III. When the 400-page manuscript was stolen from her car, Penman found herself unable to write for the next five years. She eventually rewrote the book and by the time the 936-page book was published in 1982 she had spent 12 years writing it, while practicing law at the same time.

The Sunne in Splendour is about England's Wars of the Roses. In the book, Penman characterizes King Richard III as a good, but misunderstood, ruler. She chose to write Richard's character this way after becoming fascinated with his story and researching his life, both in the US and in the UK, which led her to believe that "his was a classic case of history being rewritten by the victor". Penman rejects the common belief that Richard killed the "Princes in the Tower," the sons of his brother King Edward IV, and attributes their deaths to the overly ambitious Duke of Buckingham.

== Plot summary ==
The story begins in 1459 with Richard as a young boy, and ends in 1485 with his defeat at the Battle of Bosworth Field.

The earliest chapters portray Richard as a sensitive child who idolizes his hedonistic oldest brother Edward and is mentored by his second oldest, the wise-beyond-his-years Edmund. As Edward and Edmund support their father Richard of York, 3rd Duke of York in his rebellion against the Lancastrians, Richard witnesses the horrors of war firsthand when his family home is sacked. Richard's mother Cecily Neville, Duchess of York sends him and his near-in-age brother George to the Duchy of Burgundy for safekeeping.

When his father and Edmund are killed, Edward leads the House of York to victory and becomes king as Edward IV. Richard and George are fostered with Richard Neville, 16th Earl of Warwick, and they become close to his daughters Anne and Isabel. Warwick has a falling out with Edward over his marriage to Elizabeth Woodville which eventually leads Warwick to switch sides to the Lancastrian cause. Richard stays loyal to Edward, even as his betrothal to Anne is broken and Edward is briefly deposed. George, however, sides with Warwick and marries Isabel. George believes Warwick will put him on the throne. However, when it is clear that Warwick can't make George king, Warwick marries Anne to the Lancastrian heir Edward of Westminster, Prince of Wales. Warwick pledges support to Henry VI of England, Edward's father.

Richard develops into a brave and able commander, and he helps Edward take back his throne. When it is clear they will win, George rejoins their side. By this time Warwick is dead and Anne is a widow, with Edward of Westminster having been killed in battle. Edward of York shows mercy on her due to her age and the fact that Richard still cares for her. He places her in George and Isabel's care, but George wishes to keep Anne's fortune for himself and plans to make Anne disappear. With the help of a loyal servant, Anne escapes and hides as a kitchen maid. Richard rescues her, and once they are married, they return to her childhood home.

Richard contently rules his northern holdings with Anne by his side, with their peace interrupted by Isabel's death and George's descent into madness and paranoia. Richard expects his brother to lock George away in the Tower of London, but he is shocked when Edward has George executed despite their mother's pleas and George no longer being a threat. Richard doesn't realize that George knew of Edward's secret first marriage that would make his union with Elizabeth invalid.

Edward's debauchery catches up with him and he dies prematurely at age 40, and Richard becomes the Protector of the Realm for Edward's sons, Edward and Richard. However, as the political situation becomes more fraught and dangerous, Richard learns of Edward's previous secret marriage and Edward's children are therefore illegitimate. Richard realizes he is the rightful heir to the throne and admits to Anne that he wants the crown. Elizabeth's brother, Anthony, Lord Rivers, plots to crown young Edward without Richard's knowledge. Richard has no choice but to end his protectorship and ruthlessly assumes the throne, but he does not have his nephews killed.

Soon after Richard is crowned, both his son, Edward, and Anne, die. After two years as king, he faces his greatest challenge from an army of French mercenaries led by Henry Tudor, the future King Henry VII. At the Battle of Bosworth Field (1485), Richard is betrayed by two of his nobles, and left in a perilous situation. Richard himself is killed a few feet from Henry.
