= Sharon Kay Penman =

American historical novelist (1945–2021)

- Sharon Kay Penman in 2005
- Born: August 13, 1945; New York City, U.S.
- Died: January 22, 2021 (aged 75)
- Education: University of Texas at Austin; Rutgers Law School (JD)
- Occupation: Novelist
- Website: www.sharonkaypenman.com

Sharon Kay Penman (August 13, 1945 – January 22, 2021) was an American historical novelist, published in the UK as Sharon Penman. She was best known for the Welsh Princes Trilogy and the Plantagenet series. In addition, she wrote four medieval mysteries, the first of which, The Queen's Man, was a finalist in 1996 for the Best First Mystery Edgar Award.

Her novels and mysteries are set in England, France, and Wales, and are about English and Welsh royalty during the Middle Ages. The Sunne in Splendour, her first book, is a stand-alone novel about King Richard III of England and the Wars of the Roses. When the manuscript was stolen she started again and rewrote the book.

Her work was generally well received, with the later novels reaching the New York Times Bestseller List. Critics have praised her meticulous research of settings and events presented in her fiction, as well as the characterizations.

Penman died from pneumonia on January 22, 2021, at the age of 75.

== Career ==
Born in New York City, Penman grew up in New Jersey. She received her bachelor's degree from the University of Texas at Austin, where she majored in history. She also received a Juris Doctor (J.D.) degree from Rutgers University School of Law, and worked as a tax lawyer before becoming a writer. While a student, Penman researched and wrote The Sunne in Splendour that chronicled the life of Richard III. When the 400-page manuscript was stolen from her car, Penman found herself unable to write for the next five years. She eventually rewrote the book and by the time the 936-page book was published in 1982 she had spent 12 years writing it, while practicing law at the same time. Of practicing law, she admitted she "considered it penance." Penman lived in New Jersey, and in the early 1980s moved to Wales to research her second book, Here Be Dragons. She had a second home in the Welsh mountains where, she said, the history inspired her and provided material for her novels.

== Writing career ==
The Sunne in Splendour is about the end of England's War of the Roses. In the book, Penman characterizes King Richard III as a healthy, if misunderstood, ruler. She chose to write Richard's character in such a way after becoming fascinated with his story and researching his life, both in the United States and in the United Kingdom, which led her to believe that "his was a classic case of history being rewritten by the victor."

Once finished with The Sunne in Splendour she claimed to have become "hopelessly hooked" on writing. She had plenty of material to be written about the "rebellious sons and disgruntled brothers and conniving kings and willful queens" of the Plantagenets and hoped to write as many as a dozen books on the subject. After the publication of The Sunne in Splendour, Penman began work on the Welsh Trilogy, set primarily in Wales. The "Welsh Trilogy" was followed by the "Plantagenet series", which presents the events of the life of King Henry II and Eleanor of Aquitaine.

Penman's settings are all in the Middle Ages; the Welsh Princes trilogy is set in the 13th century, two centuries earlier than The Sunne in Splendour. During her research for Here Be Dragons, the first book in the series, she became fascinated with the complexity of the role of women in medieval society; for example, Welsh women at the time had a great deal more independence than the English women. Whether in Wales or in England, a noble wife had responsibility for a household, complete with household knights, whom the wife relied upon to keep the household safe.

In 1996, Penman published the first in the series of medieval mystery novels. Penman's first mystery, The Queen's Man, was a finalist for an Edgar Award for Best First Mystery from the Mystery Writers of America. Penman explained her reasons for turning to the mystery genre after writing only historical novels: "By the time I'd finished researching and writing When Christ and His Saints Slept, I was in danger of burning out. For the first time in nearly two decades, my boundless enthusiasm for the Middle Ages had begun to flag. So I decided I needed a change of pace, and since I am a long-time mystery fan, it occurred to me that a medieval mystery might be fun to write. Once that idea took root, it was probably inevitable that I'd choose to write about Eleanor of Aquitaine, surely one of history's most memorable women."

Set in the 12th century, Penman presents the young Justin de Quincy as a medieval sleuth. In the first book he is elevated to the status of "queen's man" by Eleanor of Aquitaine. The Queen's Man and Cruel as the Grave depict the period after King Henry II's death, as Eleanor, about age 70, rules the Angevin empire with one son (Richard) in captivity, and another son (John) hovering at the edge of power. The third novel in the series, The Dragon's Lair, is set during the same period, but Penman shifts the locale to northwest England and north Wales. And finally, in the most recent novel of the series, Prince of Darkness, Penman continues to show the conflict between mother and sons, and weaves in de Quincy's conflicts as well.

In addition to the Edgar Award, Penman was the winner of the 2001 Career Achievement Award for Historical Mysteries from Romantic Times.

== Welsh Princes trilogy ==
Here Be Dragons (1985) is the first of Penman's trilogy of novels about the medieval Welsh princes of Gwynedd. Of the novel, Penman stated, “I think Dragons is so popular because it was virgin territory for most readers. The saga of the Plantagenets was much better known, but not many people were familiar with medieval Wales or its princes. And then, too, the story of Llewelyn the Great and Joanna, King John's illegitimate daughter, is a remarkable one, which struck an emotional chord with many readers.”

In Falls the Shadow (1988) Penman chronicles the family relationships of King Henry III and his brother-in-law Simon de Montfort. Falls the Shadow is a bridge novel as Penman uses the Simon de Montfort rebellion to lead her to the conclusion of the trilogy in The Reckoning. As Penman explained: '“After I'd finished Here Be Dragons, I knew I wanted to continue the story… At first I'd planned to write one book in which Simon de Montfort would share top billing with Llewelyn Fawr's grandson, Llewelyn ap Gruffydd, who later wed Simon's daughter. I soon realized, though, that this was too much to tackle in one book, that Simon and Llewelyn each deserved his own novel. So I decided to devote Falls the Shadow to Simon and The Reckoning to Llewelyn".

Penman's characterization of Simon de Montfort is that of a man increasingly disillusioned by his sovereign, who rebels in 1263, becomes regent to Henry III, and attempts to re-establish rights granted under the Magna Carta. In addition to the story of Simon de Montfort and his wife, Eleanor the Countess of Pembroke and sister to King Henry III, the novel presents characters such as the Welsh ruler Llywelyn Fawr and London's FitzThomas.

Of her research for Falls the Shadow, Penman explained: "I did a great deal of on-site research, visiting the castles and battlefields that figured in Falls the Shadow, visiting the Reading Room at the British Library, the National Library of Wales in Aberystwyth, and local reference libraries… Here at home, I made use of the University of Pennsylvania Library in Philadelphia, which has an excellent medieval selection. But it really helped to see the scenes for myself. At Lewes, we actually walked along the same path that Simon de Montfort and his men would have followed. It was breathtaking to stand on the Downs, gazing out upon the same view that he would have seen".

The Reckoning (1991) chronicles the reign of England's King Henry III in Penman's final volume of the series that began with Here Be Dragons. The conflict between the Welsh prince Llewelyn ap Gruffydd who is the grandson of Llewelyn the Great of Here Be Dragons, and England's King Henry III is one subplot. Additionally, Penman chronicles the life and character of Ellen, daughter of Simon de Montfort and niece to Henry III; her betrothal to Llewelyn (negotiated prior to de Montfort's death); and the conflict between Ellen and her cousin Edward, soon to become King Edward, who opposes the betrothal.

== Plantagenet series ==
The Plantagenet series focuses on the Angevin King Henry II and his wife Eleanor of Aquitaine, beginning with the sinking of the White Ship, the marriage of the Empress Maude and Geoffrey of Anjou, and Henry's birth and childhood in When Christ and His Saints Slept. Of Henry and Eleanor, Penman explained:

Henry II and Eleanor of Aquitaine were larger than life, legends in their own lifetimes. He was one of the greatest of the medieval kings, and she was the only woman to wear the crowns of both England and France. They loved and fought and schemed on a stage that stretched from the Scots border to the Mediterranean Sea. Their children were branded by contemporaries as "The Devil’s Brood," but they founded a dynasty that was to rule England for three hundred years.

My first novel in their trilogy [sic], When Christ and His Saints Slept, traces the beginning of their tempestuous union. Time and Chance continues their story at high noon. From the greenwoods of Wales to a bloodied floor at Canterbury Cathedral, theirs was an amazing story, and I very much enjoyed being along for the ride!

When Christ and His Saints Slept introduces the genesis of the Plantagenet dynasty as Empress Maude fights to secure her claim to the English throne. In the 15 years she spent writing three novels and four mysteries set during the period of Henry II and Eleanor of Aquitaine Penman claimed she found no villains. Instead she focused on the human characteristics: she believed Henry II was a brilliant king but a bad father. Of Eleanor of Aquitaine, she claimed she was a "law unto herself", and Penman was intrigued by the role of a medieval queen.

Time and Chance (2002), a New York Times Bestseller, continues the story of Eleanor of Aquitaine and her husband, and focuses on the rift between Henry II and Thomas Becket.

Time and Chance spans a 15-year period from 1156 to 1171 as Henry II became estranged from his wife (although Eleanor and Henry have eight children during thirteen years), and from his close friend and advisor Thomas Becket. King Henry's decision to elevate Becket to the Archbishop of Canterbury becomes a fulcrum for discord between Henry and Eleanor.

Devil's Brood (2008) opens with the conflict between Henry II, his wife Eleanor of Aquitaine, and their four sons, which escalates into a decade of warfare and rebellion pitting the sons against the father and the brothers against each other while Eleanor spends the period imprisoned by Henry. Penman places the characters against a tightly woven tapestry of medieval life, personal conflict, and dramatic characters.

The Devil's Brood was supposed to be the final volume in Penman's Plantagenet series, but the "Angevins were not ready to go quietly into that good night." Lionheart (2011) is about the children of Henry II and Eleanor of Aquitaine. The book focuses on Richard the Lionheart's Crusades in the Holy Land, and on what happened to Eleanor when she was finally released after spending sixteen years in a confinement that was ordered and enforced by her husband. A King's Ransom is about the second half of Richard's life, during and following his imprisonment, ransom, and life afterward.

== Writing characteristics ==
Penman's approach to her novels is to present meticulously researched medieval life and history as everyday life, and to present the nobility as fallible. Set against a backdrop of political tension, power struggles, war, and hardship, the main characters confront personal drama such as conflict in love, conflict between family members, conflict with God, and conflict in friendship, as well as conflicted loyalties between family, self, king and country. A Library Journal review praises Penman's attention to detail in which she "combines an in-depth knowledge of medieval Europe with vivid storytelling, re-creating the complex events and emotional drama of the 12th – 15th centuries."

When I first visited Dolwyddelan, I had to park my car off the road, ask at the farmhouse if I could see the castle, and then trudge up the hill, dodging sheep. I am also very fond of Rhaeadr Ewynnol, today's Swallow Falls, which looks much as it did in Llewelyn and Joanna's time...
—Sharon Kay Penman

Although set in the 12th and 13th centuries, Penman sets the characters and narrative in her novels in medieval sites that still exist and can be visited, including castles, churches and archeological areas. Areas such as Aber Falls and Dolwyddelan Castle have important scenes in Penman's novels. In Devil's Brood, Penman sets the characters in scenes in a variety of medieval royal residences, castles and abbeys, in England and present day France, many of which still exist such as the Château de Chinon, Fontevrault Abbey, and Château de Loches.

== Bibliography ==
- The Sunne in Splendour. New York: Holt, Rinehart, and Winston, c1982. ISBN 0-03-061368-X. London: Macmillan, 1983, c1982, ISBN 0-333-34463-4.
- The Land Beyond the Sea (New York/London: Macmillan. January 20, 2020. ISBN 9780399165283). (Her last novel).

=== Welsh Princes trilogy ===
- Here Be Dragons New York: Holt, Rinehart, and Winston, c1985 ISBN 0-03-062773-7 London: Collins, 1986 ISBN 0-00-222960-9
- Falls the Shadow. New York: H. Holt, c1988 ISBN 0-8050-0300-2 London: Joseph, 1988 ISBN 0-7181-2923-7
- The Reckoning New York: H. Holt, 1991 ISBN 0-8050-1014-9 London: Joseph, 1991 ISBN 0-7181-2948-2

=== Plantagenet series ===
- When Christ and His Saints Slept New York: H. Holt, 1995 ISBN 0-8050-1015-7 London: Joseph, 1994 ISBN 0-7181-3585-7
- Time and Chance New York: G.P. Putnam's Sons, c2002 ISBN 0-399-14785-3 London: Joseph, 2002 ISBN 0-7181-4308-6
- Devil's Brood New York: G.P. Putnam's Sons, c2008 ISBN 978-0-399-15526-0 London: Joseph, 2009 ISBN 0-7181-5465-7
- Lionheart New York: G.P. Putnam's Sons, c2011 ISBN 0-399-15785-9 London: Marian Wood Books/Putnam, 2011 ISBN 978-0-399-15785-1
- A King's Ransom New York: Marian Wood Books/Putnam, c2014 ISBN 978-0-399-15922-0 London: Macmillan 2014 ISBN 978-0-230-76805-5

=== Justin de Quincy mysteries ===
- The Queen's Man New York : H. Holt, 1996 ISBN 0-8050-1015-7 London: Joseph, 1996 ISBN 0-7181-3981-X
- Cruel as the Grave New York : Henry Holt, 1998 ISBN 0-8050-5608-4 London: Joseph, 1998 ISBN 0-7181-4307-8
- Dragon's Lair New York : G.P. Putnam's Sons, c2003 ISBN 0-399-15077-3 London: Penguin, 2005 ISBN 0-14-025098-0 (pbk.)
- Prince of Darkness New York : G.P. Putnam's Sons, c2005 ISBN 0-399-15256-3
