= Devil's Brood =

2008 historical novel by Sharon Kay Penman

- First edition dustjacket for Devil's Brood
- Author: Sharon Kay Penman
- Language: English
- Genre: Historical fiction
- Published: 2008 Putnam/Marian Wood
- Publication place: United States
- Media type: Print (Book)
- Pages: 734
- ISBN: 0-399-15526-0
- Preceded by: Time and Chance
- Followed by: Lionheart

Devil's Brood is a historical novel written by Sharon Kay Penman, published in 2008, and is the third volume in her Plantagenet series, preceded by When Christ and His Saints Slept and Time and Chance, and followed by Lionheart (2011).

The novel is about the last two decades in Henry II's life, his imprisonment of his wife Eleanor of Aquitaine, and his sons who undertake a decade-long rebellion against their father. Penman explores the tensions that built in the royal marriage and the deconstruction of the marriage. The historical details of the 12th century Angevin kings are detailed. Generally the novel received good reviews and became a New York Times bestseller.

== Plot summary ==
Devil's Brood continues the story of King Henry II and his Queen Eleanor that began in When Christ and His Saints Slept and continued in Time and Chance. Devil's Brood opens with the conflict between Henry II, his wife Eleanor of Aquitaine, and their four sons, which escalates into a decade of warfare and rebellion pitting the sons against the father and the brothers against each other while the mother spends the period imprisoned by her husband.

The novel opens in 1172 when Henry and Eleanor have been married for decades and have four grown sons: Henry the Young King, Richard the Lionheart, Geoffrey II and John Lackland. During the final 18 years of Henry's life conflict builds with Eleanor, beginning with her desire to choose her successor for Aquitaine. This conflict reaches it peak with the death of Rosamund Clifford, a mistress who he flaunted at court. Rumours abound that Eleanor had her poisoned out of jealousy; in a rage, Henry has her imprisoned, first in France and then in England, while he goes to war against France. The four sons each want to rule a piece of territory and war breaks out among the sons as they plot with their mother and enter into a rebellion against Henry, in the process aligning themselves with France's king Louis VII—England's enemy. The consequences of Henry's sons' rebellion weakens the Angevin empire. At the end, Henry dies with only his household knights at his bedside.

== Themes ==
Devil's Brood focuses on the deconstruction of a royal family. The destruction was both personal and spilled over to cause war. In the novel, Penman investigates the role of a strong medieval queen who rebels against her husband. Furthermore, Penman explores the theme of betrayal: Henry II considers the rebellion against him by his sons and wife as personal and political betrayal. Finally, the question of how a man reconciles personal and family needs with the demands of kingship are examined through Henry's actions as father, husband and ruler.

== Writing characteristics ==
Set against a backdrop of political tension, power struggles, war, and hardship, the main characters confront personal drama such as conflict in love, conflict between family members, conflict between one's God, and conflict in friendship, as well as conflicted loyalties between family, self, king and country. A Library Journal review notes Penman's attention to detail in which she "combines an in-depth knowledge of medieval Europe ...re-creating the complex events and emotional drama of the 12th century."

== Reception ==
The hardcover edition of the book was a New York Times bestseller. Library Journal gave it a favorable review and recommended the novel. The reviewer writes: "Penman does a remarkable job of depicting passionate, dramatic characters and the perilous times in which they live." The Booklist review was not quite as positive. The reviewer noted the novel is "exhaustive (and exhausting)" and that the "prose tends to lumber along like a medieval oxcart."

== Publication history ==
The first edition was published in hardback in the United States in October 2008 at 734 pages by G. P. Putnam's Sons (ISBN 978-0-399-15526-0) The first British edition was released in 2009 published by Michael Josephs at 736 pages (ISBN 0-7181-5465-7).

== See also ==
- Historical fiction
