= Rhun (Welsh given name) =

- Gender: Masculine

Origin
- Origin: from Welsh Rhun
- Meaning: "Great, Mighty"
- Region of origin: Gwynedd

Other names
- Related names: Rhŷn; Rhyn
- Original pronunciation Anglicised pronunciation

Rhun is a Welsh Masculine given name meaning "Great, Mighty". Variants of the name are Rhûn, Rhyn and Rhŷn.

One origin of the name appears to start from the Welsh names for Rome and Roman (as a person), Rhufain and Rhufon, leading to Rhun as "the proper name of a man" and Rhyon as a soldier.

== Rhun in literature ==
The story of The Dream of Rhonabwy in the 12th century Red Book of Hergest is a prose literary tale where the main character travels to the time of King Arthur in a dream. There he sees famous men from many historical eras. In a passage where 24 knights arrive to seek a truce with the famous Arthur, Arthur considers the request by assembling his counselors where "a tall, auburn, curly-headed man" was standing. Rhonabwy asks who he is, and is told that he is Rhun ap Maelgwn Gwynedd, a man who may join in counsel with anyone, because there was none in Britain better skilled in counsel than he.

"Marwnad Rhun" (English: "Elegy of Rhun"), once believed to be the work of Taliesin but no longer accepted as such, laments Rhun's death in battle during that war with the North.

Rhun, son of Maelgwn, appears in two of the medieval Welsh Triads, as one of the 'Fair Princes of the Isle of Britain', and as one of the 'Golden-banded Ones of the Isle of Britain'.

Rhûn also appears as a realm in the East of the map in J. R. R. Tolkien's The Hobbit and The Lord of the Rings

== List of bearers ==
- Rhun ap Maelgwn (died c. 586), king of Gwynedd
- Rhun ab Urien, (Born c. late 6th, early 7th century) Prince and son of Urien, king of Rheged
- Rhun ab Arthgal, (born c. 9th century) king of Strathclyde
- Rhun ab Owain Gwynedd (died 1146), son of Owain Gwynedd
- Rhun ap Iorwerth (born 1972), Welsh politician
