= Time and Chance (Penman novel) =

Novel by Sharon Kay Penman

- First edition
- Author: Sharon Kay Penman
- Cover artist: Judith Stagnitto Abbatte
- Language: English
- Genre: Historical fiction
- Publisher: Putnam
- Publication date: 2002
- Publication place: United States
- Media type: Print (Book)
- Pages: 512
- ISBN: 0-399-14785-3
- Preceded by: When Christ and His Saints Slept
- Followed by: Devil's Brood

Time and Chance is a historical novel written by Sharon Kay Penman published in 2002 and is the second volume in the Plantagenet trilogy, preceded by When Christ and His Saints Slept and followed by Devil's Brood.

== Plot ==
Time and Chance is about King Henry II, Eleanor of Aquitaine, and the rift between Henry II and Thomas Becket. Time and Chance is the sequel to Penman's When Christ and His Saints Slept and spans a 15-year period from 1156 to 1171. Penman brings alive for the reader the period as King Henry II becomes increasingly estranged from his wife Eleanor of Aquitaine (although Eleanor and Henry have eight children during the eight years), and from his close friend and adviser Thomas Becket. King Henry II's decision to elevate Becket to Archbishop of Canterbury is a fulcrum for discord between Henry and Eleanor. Moreover, Becket must reconcile duty to his sovereign and duty to his God which ultimately leads to his death and martyrdom and stains King Henry II's reign. The novel ends with a detailed description of Becket's death: the knights who pursued him inform Becket he was to go to Winchester to give an account of his actions, but Becket refuses. At this, they retrieve their weapons and rush inside the cathedral for the killing. With the third and final blow, the crown of his head was separated from the head, and the blood dyes the floor of the cathedral.

== Development ==
In her Plantagenet Trilogy Penman chronicles King Henry II's life, beginning with his childhood in "When Christ and His Saints Slept." Of Henry II and his wife Eleanor of Aquitaine, Penman explains:

Henry II and Eleanor of Aquitaine were larger than life, legends in their own lifetimes. He was one of the greatest of the medieval kings, and she was the only woman to wear the crowns of both England and France. They loved and fought and schemed on a stage that stretched from the Scots border to the Mediterranean Sea. Their children were branded by contemporaries as "The Devil's Brood," but they founded a dynasty that was to rule England for three hundred years.

My first novel in their trilogy, When Christ and His Saints Slept, traces the beginning of their tempestuous union. Time and Chance continues their story at high noon. From the greenwoods of Wales to a bloodied floor at Canterbury Cathedral, theirs was an amazing story, and I very much enjoyed being along for the ride!

== Reception ==
Time and Chance became a New York Times bestseller.
