= Carndochan Castle =

13th-century castle in Wales

- Llanuwchllyn, Gwynedd, Wales
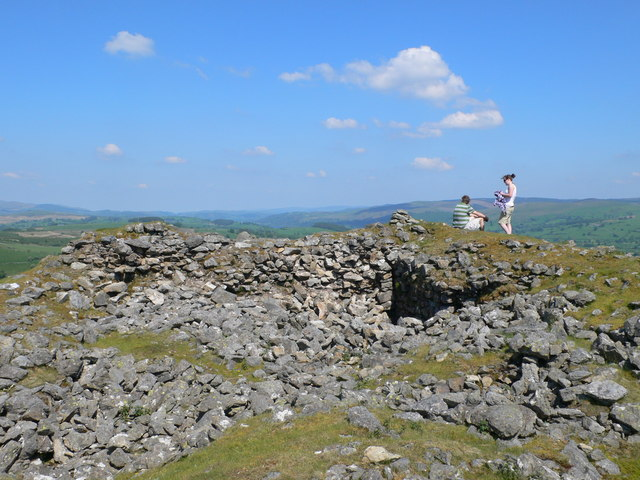

Site information
- Type: Castle
- Condition: Ruins

Location
- Shown within Wales
- Location within Wales
- Coordinates: 52.86105°N 3.71391°W

Site history
- Built by: Llywelyn ap Iorwerth?

Scheduled monument
- Official name: Castell Carn Dochan
- Reference no.: ME049

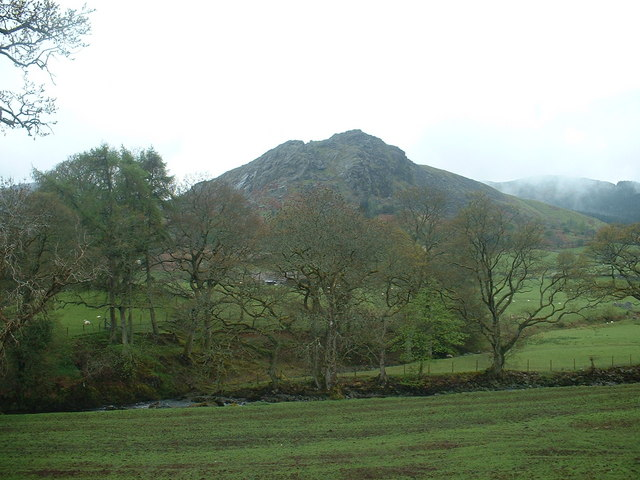
Looking towards Castell Carndochan

Carndochan Castle (Welsh: Castell Carndochan) is a ruined stone castle near Llanuwchllyn, Gwynedd, north Wales. It was probably built in the early thirteenth century and is a Scheduled Ancient Monument.

== History ==
The castle stands on a ridge overlooking the Lliw Valley; its early history is unrecorded, but it is thought to have been built by Prince Llywelyn ap Iorwerth between 1215 and 1230 or Prince Llywelyn ap Gruffudd. Little is known of the site's history although King Edward I of England visited in 1283–84.

== Description ==
Built in typical Welsh style, it consisted of a D-shaped tower on its western end with smaller round or semi-round towers surrounding a small ward and square central tower. The apsidal tower survives up to a height of 8 feet (2.4 m) and used a different source of lime for its coursed mortar, which may indicate that it was built at a different time than the rest of the structure.

Two of the other towers are dry stone-built and resemble to those at Carn Fadryn and Pen y Castell. A preliminary 2015 excavation in the southern part of the castle revealed the entrance, a small half-round tower and a length of curtain wall. The excavation recovered two pieces of charcoal that radiocarbon dating yielded dates of 1170–1258 for one and 1220–1271 for the other.

It is not known when or why Carndochan was abandoned, although unsubstantiated excavations by nineteenth-century archaeologists apparently discovered substantial amounts of ash under the ruins, suggesting the castle was either sacked or demolished (often termed slighting). Today, the site is protected as a scheduled monument.
