= When Christ and His Saints Slept =

1994 historical novel by Sharon Kay Penman

First UK edition (publ. Michael Joseph)

When Christ and His Saints Slept is a historical novel written by Sharon Kay Penman, published in 1994. It is the first of Penman's Plantagenet trilogy, (ultimately five books) followed by Time and Chance, Devil's Brood, Lionheart and A King's Ransom. In the book Penman introduces the genesis of the Plantagenet dynasty as Empress Maude battles to secure her claim to the English throne, ultimately more for her young son Henry Plantagenet, than for herself. Penman chronicles the story of cousins Maude and Stephen as they fight for England's throne.

Publishers Weekly gave a positive review of When Christ and His Saints Slept. The book was described as a "magnificent combination of history and humanity" in which Penman presents "complicated politics" in a persuasive manner with well-presented characters. Although based on real life historical characters—Queen Maude and King Stephen are the main protagonists—it was thought that, in the fictional character Ranulf, Penman added a "successful addition". The only complaint was that the era in which Penman sets the action (12th century England) "lacks epic qualities." The novel had a first printing of 75,000 copies with a major ad and promotion campaign and author tour.
