= Edwin of Tegeingl =

Welsh prince (c. 1020–1073)

Edwin of Tegeingl (about 1020 – 1073) was a prince or lord of the cantref of Tegeingl in north-east Wales.

== Biography ==
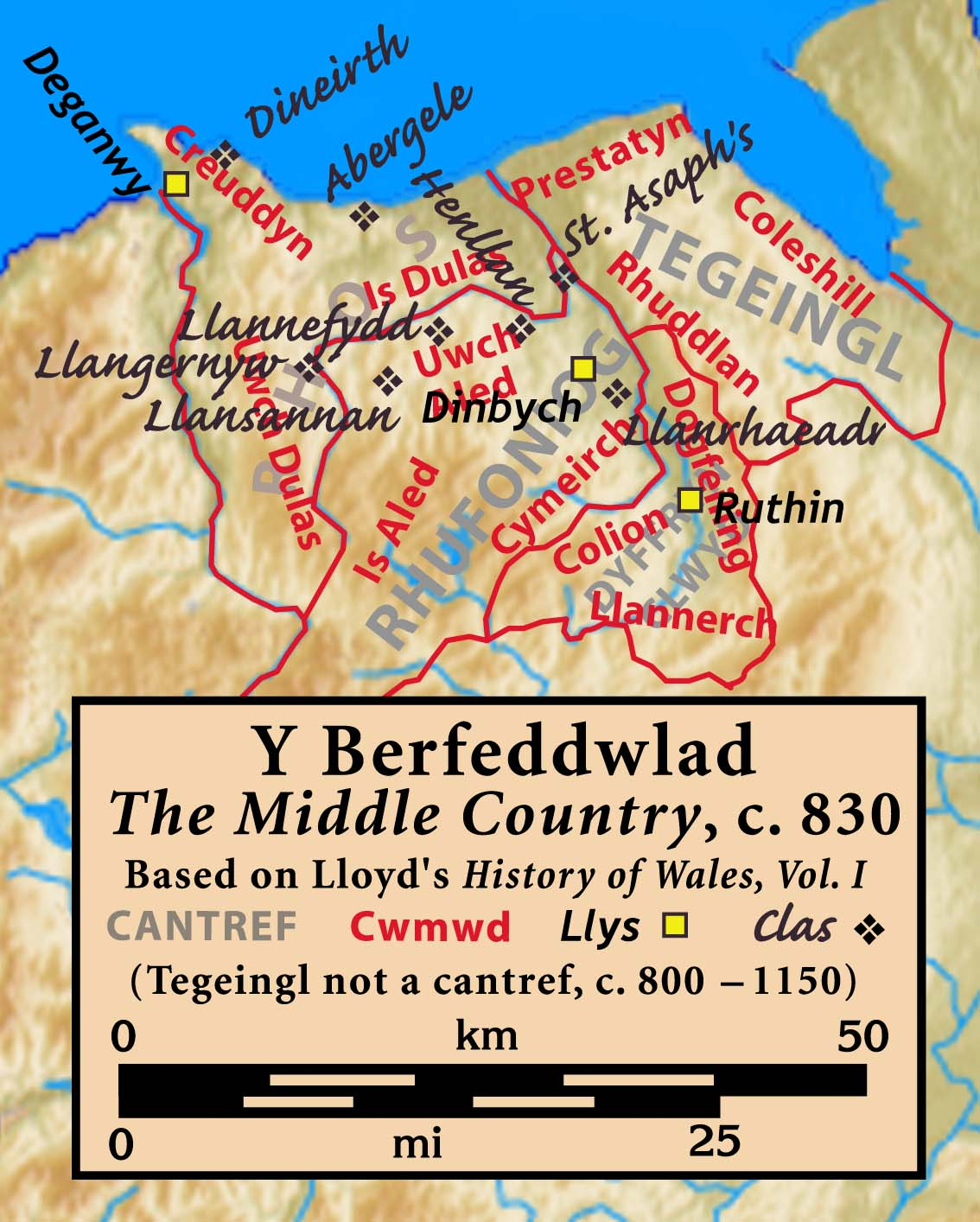

Later pedigrees provide Edwin and his descendants with a Welsh pedigree, making him son of Gronwy and great-great-grandson of Hywel Dda. However, it has been suggested that this pedigree may have been a late invention, and that his name points to an Anglo-Saxon origin. Edwin was Lord or Prince of the cantref of Tegeingl. The cantref formed the eastern part of Perfeddwlad (or Y Berfeddwlad) on the northern coast of Wales between the River Clwyd and Deeside. The territory, originally forming part of the Kingdom of Gwynedd, had been under the control of the Anglo-Saxons for several centuries and then changed hands several times between the two.

There is no reference to him in the chronicles of Wales; there are, however, references to his sons. Edwin married Gwerydd, sister of Bleddyn ap Cynfyn, Prince of Gwynedd and Powys.)

Attributed arms of Edwin of Tegeingl

== Descendants ==
Edwin would come to be regarded as founder of one of the Fifteen Tribes of Wales, and as such antiquarians in later centuries would invent attributed arms for him. He had three sons, Owain, Uchdryd, and Hywel.
