= Mold Castle =

Mold Castle Bailey Hill
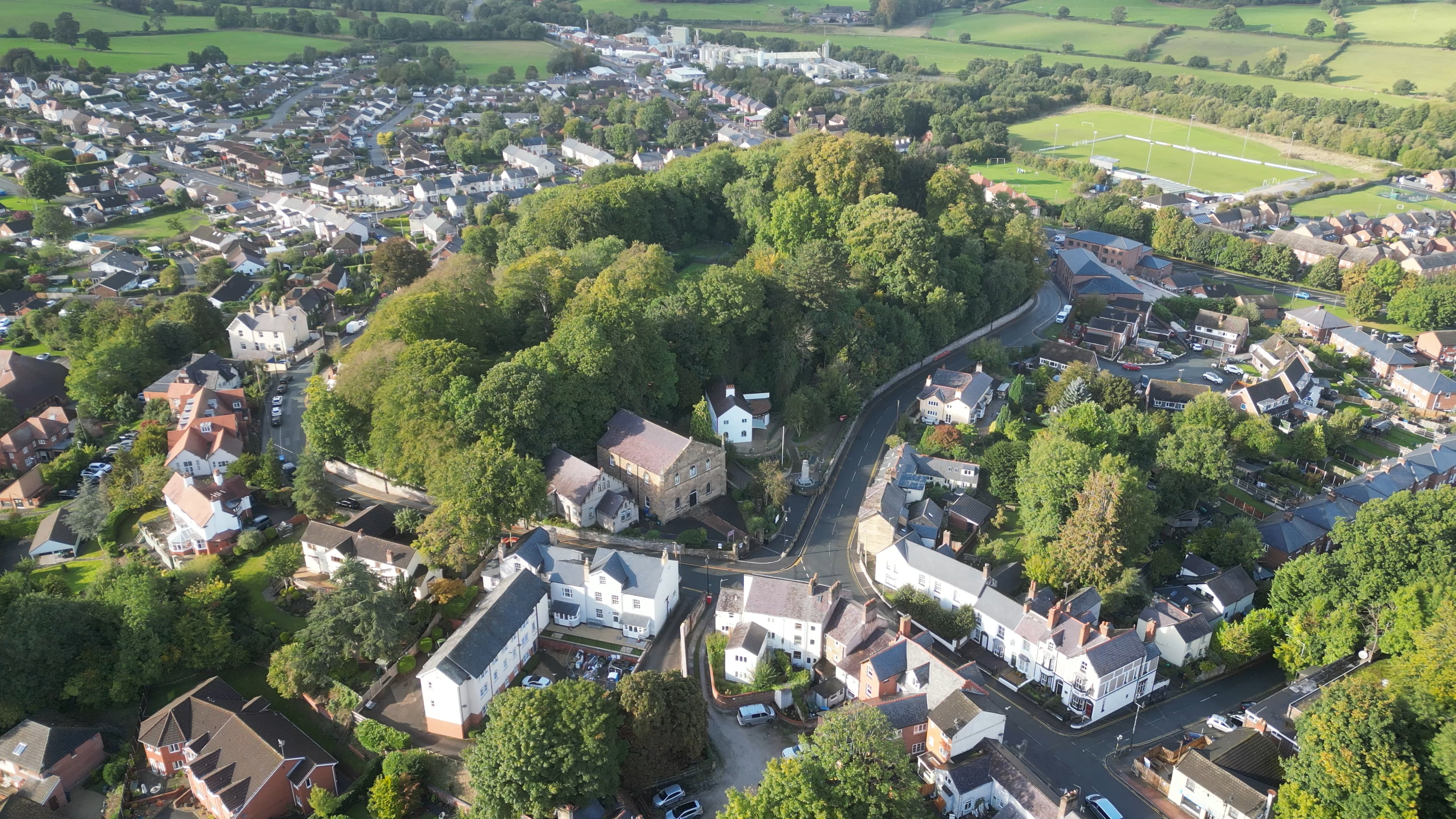
- Aerial view of the site

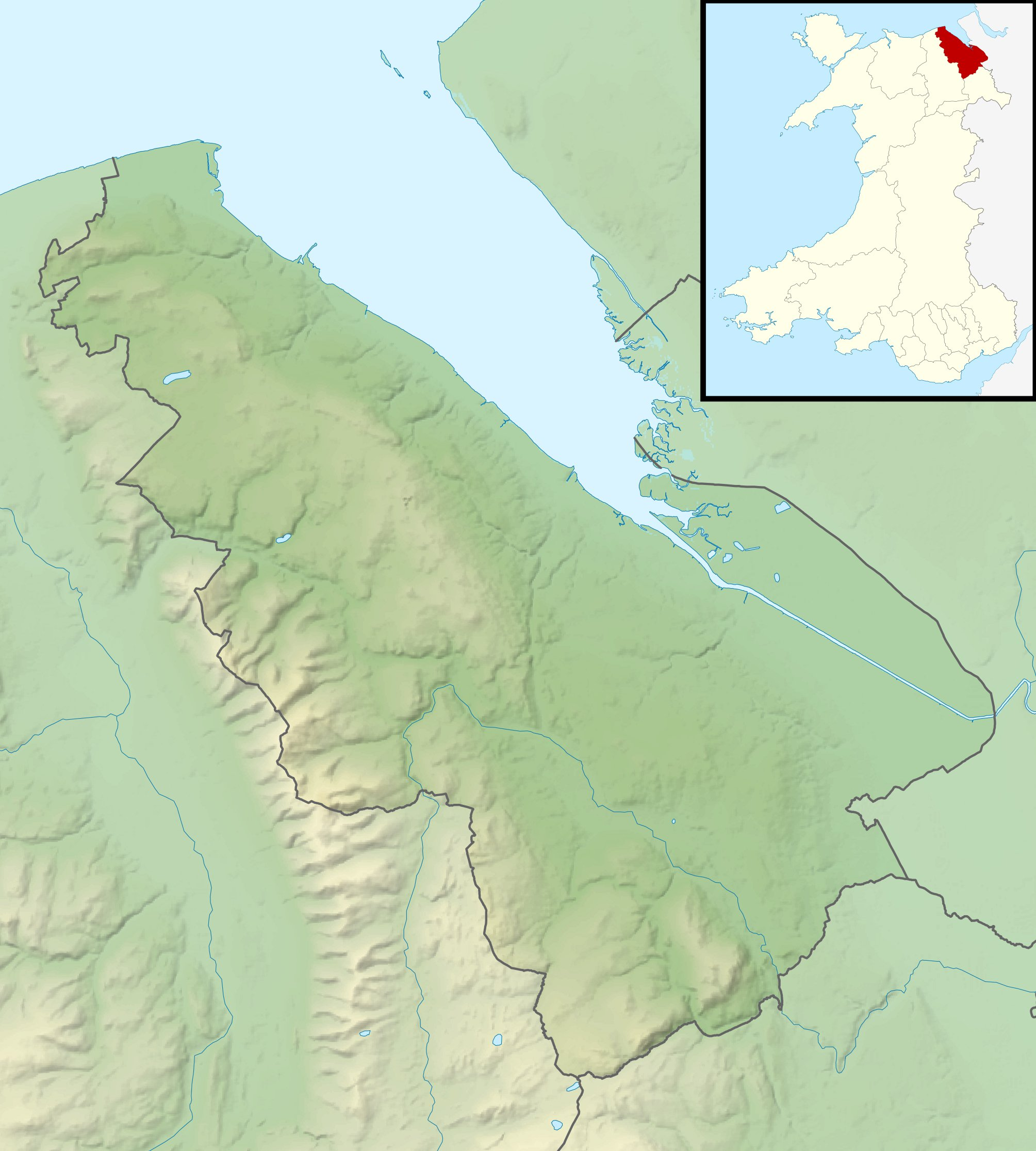
- Location in Flintshire
- 53.17038°N 3.14544°W
- Type: Motte-and-bailey castle
- Location: Mold, Flintshire, Wales
- Nearest city: Wrexham

Scheduled monument
- Official name: The Bailey Hill, Mold
- Reference no.: FL014

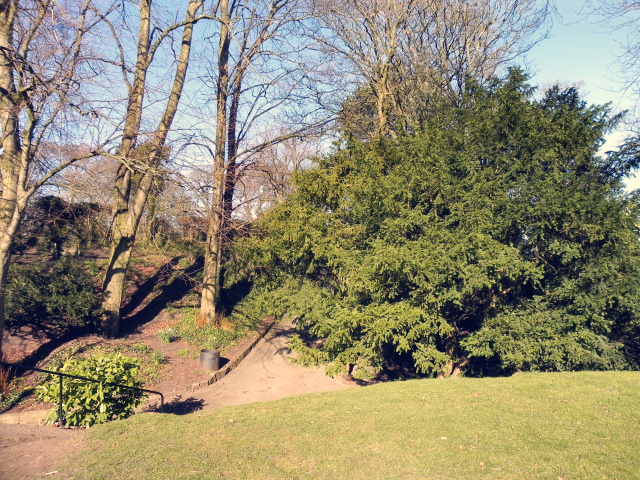
The outer bailey of Mold Castle

Mold Castle (Welsh: Castell yr Wyddgrug), also known as Bailey Hill in the town of Mold, Flintshire, north-east Wales, is a motte-and-bailey castle erected around 1072, probably by the Norman Robert de Montalt under instructions from Hugh d'Avranches, Earl of Chester. Little remains except the mound on which the motte was built. It stands close to the 15th-century parish church, St Mary's Church near the centre of the town.

== History ==
Mold Castle was built upon an existing earthwork. A motte and bailey fortress was erected c. 1072 - possibly by Robert de Montalt, a descendant of Eustace De Monte Alto, a Norman warrior in the service of Hugh Lupus, Earl of Chester. This family originated in Monthault, Ille-et-Vilaine, in the Duchy of Brittany, not then part of France, but it has been proposed that they took their name from 'mont haut', meaning 'high hill', and associated it with this earthwork.

This name may have become corrupted, down the years, until it became 'Mold'. So Bailey Hill may have given the town its name. In 1146 it was captured by Owain Gwynedd. It switched hands on several occasions before a long period under Welsh control during the reign of Llywelyn ab Iorwerth. It remained a defensive structure up until the 13th century. During the English Civil War, Mold was captured by the Parliamentarians, recovered by the Royalists and fell again to Cromwell's forces.

== The site ==
The site came into the possession of the Mostyn family and in 1790 they surrounded it with a stone wall, planted trees and converted it into a garden. In 1890 it was sold to Mold Council. They have created a memorial garden to honour the soldiers of Mold who fell in World War I, and this incorporates the castle site. What is visible nowadays is a conical mound, which once supported the motte, enclosed in a rectangular bailey. The site became a town park in 1920, with a bowling green in the inner bailey and tennis courts in the outer bailey.

After the park fell into disrepair, it was restored over several years, including building ramps, creating a performance space in the inner bailey, and building an interpretation centre; the site is scheduled to reopen in April 2022. In the course of the work, in 2020 excavations by the Clwyd-Powys Archaeological Trust revealed the remains of a large masonry wall on the edge of the inner bailey, which could have been part of the fortifications or an internal building and suggested the original castle may have been timber.
