= Rhun ab Owain Gwynedd =

Eldest child of Owain Gwynedd (died 1146)

Rhun ab Owain Gwynedd was the eldest child of Owain Gwynedd (the king of Gwynedd between 1137 and 1170). His mother was an Irish woman Pyfog (sometimes called Ffynnod Wyddeles) who was one of his father's many mistresses. Despite being illegitimate he was his father's favourite child and chosen successor. However, his premature death in 1146 is said to have cast his father into a deep depression which was only cured when he heard his forces had captured Mold Castle from the English.

== Physical Appearance ==
The Brut y Tywysogion describes Rhun ab Owain Gwynedd as: "fair of form and aspect, kind of conversation, and affable to all... tall of stature and fair of complexion, with curly yellow hair, long of countenance, with eyes somewhat blue... he had a long and thick neck, broad chest, long waist, large thighs, long legs which were slender above his feet; his feet were long and his toes were straight."
