= Tourism Partnership North Wales =

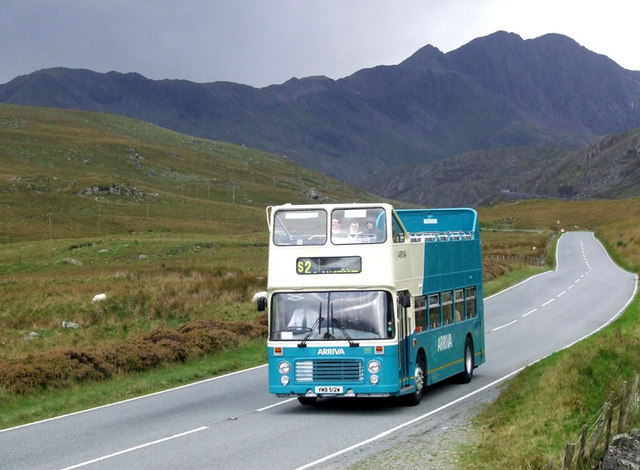
An open air bus tours through Snowdonia carrying walkers and tourists alike.

Tourism Partnership North Wales (TPNW) was the Regional Tourism Partnership (RTP) serving North Wales. Visit Wales, and part of the National Assembly for Wales initiated the formation of 4 RTPs across Wales to receive devolved resources and responsibilities for many aspects of tourism, marketing and development.

== About ==
The partners in TPNW are all the local authorities and a broad spread of tourism, hospitality, and leisure industry representatives from across the Region. TPNW acts as the lead body supporting tourism throughout North Wales and works closely with Cadw, Tourism Training for Wales and the 6 Local Authorities as well as Snowdonia National Park. The Partnership is the first public or private bodies in Wales to use QR codes on behalf of local businesses and are looking into using AR leyers on smart phones.

The Partnership engages with tourist associations such as VisitScotland and VisitBritain, consortia and other marketing groups in all areas and sectors of the region – plus local authorities and communities to establish their marketing priorities. A Promotional budget of £1 million is given to the Partnership by the Welsh Government to look after its regions: Conwy, Caernarfon, Wrexham, Llangollen / Dee Valley and Betws-y-Coed.

The Partnership has an accredited scheme for hotels and other businesses called the Green Dragon.

== Approach to tourism ==
The partnership has many specific themes which it supports, e.g., the launch of its golf based website, which increased on-line bookings to £500,000 in 2009-10 which in turn had a very positive effect on the local economy.

== See also ==
- South West Wales Tourism Partnership
