= Helen Fulton =

Professor of medieval literature

Helen Fulton is an academic specialising in medieval literature. She is a professor at the University of Bristol.

== Career ==
Helen Fulton studied at the University of Oxford and the University of Sydney. Following her PhD completion at the University of Sydney, she spent three years as a postdoctoral fellow at the University of Wales in Aberystwyth. She then worked as a lecturer and associate professor at the University of Sydney, before being appointed Professor of English at Swansea University in 2005, where she was also head of the School of Arts. She worked as professor of medieval literature and head of the Department of English at the University of York from 2010 to 2015, before being appointed professor and chair of medieval literature at the University of Bristol's Department of English, a post she currently holds.

She has previously held visiting research fellowships at Corpus Christi College, Cambridge, Clare Hall, Cambridge, St John's College, Oxford and Magdalen College, Oxford and in 2024 she will be visiting research fellow at the Humanities Research Centre in the Australian National University in Canberra.

She is the chair of the editorial board of the University of Wales Press and has been the editor of the Transactions of the Honourable Society of Cymmrodorion since 2008. She has formerly held a University of Wales postdoctoral fellowship at the Centre for Advanced Welsh and Celtic Studies in Aberystwyth and from 2020 to 2023, held a Leverhulme postdoctoral fellowship.

In 2014 she was elected a Fellow of the Society of Antiquaries and, in 2015, she was elected a Fellow of the Learned Society of Wales, where she is currently vice president for humanities, arts and social sciences.

== Research ==
She specialises in medieval Welsh literature and its connection to medieval English and Irish literature. Her main research interests include history and politics of medieval literature, classical reception in the Middle Ages, Arthurian literature and medieval urban literature. She has been the principal investigator or co-investigator of 17 funded research projects in the United Kingdom and Australia.

== Selected works ==
- Fulton, Helen (2012). A Companion to Arthurian Literature. Chichester: Wiley-Blackwell. ISBN 978-0-4706-7237-2
- Fulton, Helen (2012). Urban Culture in Medieval Wales. Cardiff: University of Wales Press. ISBN 978-0-7083-2503-2
- Fulton, Helen; Evans, Geraint (eds) (2019). The Cambridge History of Welsh Literature. Cambridge: Cambridge University Press. ISBN 978-1-107-10676-5
- Fulton, Helen (2021). Chaucer and Italian Culture. Cardiff: University of Wales Press. ISBN 978-1-78683-678-6
