= Owain ab Edwin of Tegeingl =

Welsh nobleman and soldier

Owain ab Edwin of Tegeingl or Owain the Traitor (Welsh: Owain Fradwr), (died 1105) was lord of the cantref of Tegeingl in north-east Wales at the end of the 11th century. He was the son of Edwin ap Gronw of Tegeingl, a great-great-grandson of Hywel Dda. He sided with the Normans in their failed invasion of North Wales, and in the 1090s attempted to become ruler of Gwynedd.

His arms were gules three men's legs conjoined at the thighs in triangle argent.

== Ancestry ==
Little is known of Owain's father, Edwin of Tegeingl. His paternal grandmother is believed to have been Ethelfleda or Aldgyth, daughter of Eadwine of Mercia, brother of Leofwine. Most medieval pedigrees identify Owain's paternal grandfather as Gronwy, a descendant of Hywel Dda. Owain may have been a great-great-great-grandson of Hywel Dda although this is disputed. His mother was Iwerydd, sister of Bleddyn ap Cynfyn, Prince of Gwynedd and Powys (1063–1075).

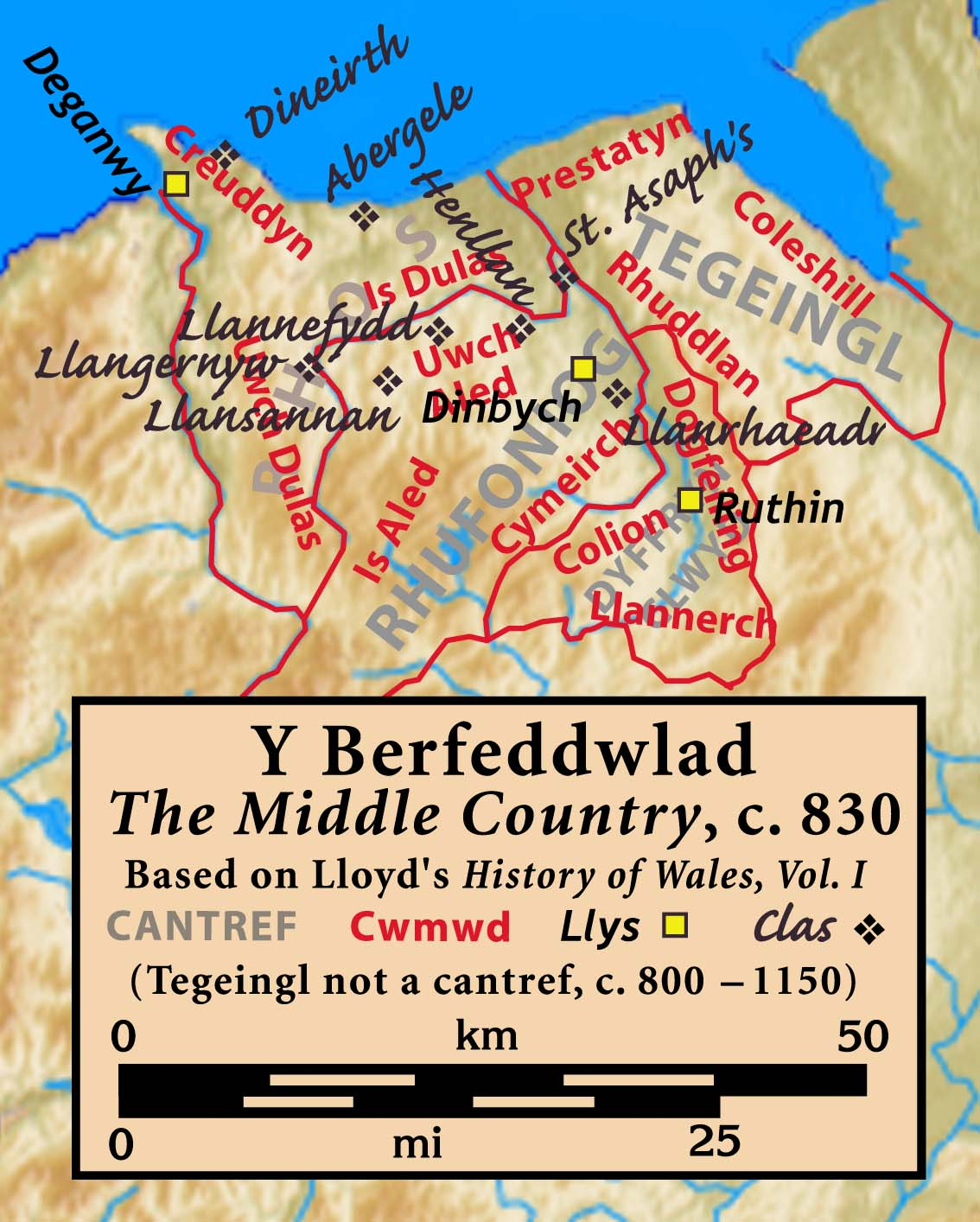

== Biography ==
=== Lordship of Tegeingl ===
Owain was Lord or Prince of the cantref of Tegeingl. The cantref formed the eastern part of Perfeddwlad (or Y Berfeddwlad) on the northern coast of Wales between the River Clwyd and Deeside. The territory, originally forming part of the Kingdom of Gwynedd, had been under the control of the Anglo-Saxons for several centuries and then changed hands several times between the two. Owain's father, Edwin, appears to have been raised to the lordship of Tegeingl by Gruffydd ap Llywelyn, ruler of most of Wales between 1055 and 1063. Edwin died in 1073 and Owain succeeded him as lord.

=== Challenge to the kingship ===
It appears that Owain made a challenge for the kingship of Gwynedd and may have succeeded in holding it for a time in the 1090s. Links to previous rulers through the female line were very important in establishing a claim, and Owain's relationship with Bleddyn ap Cynfyn through his mother would have been relevant.

=== Role in the Norman Invasion ===
In the 1080s and the 1090s, the Normans led by Hugh d'Avranches, 1st Earl of Chester made several attempts to invade and gain control of North Wales. Owain ap Edwin transferred his allegiance to the Normans following the defeat of his ally Trahaearn ap Caradog, prince of Gwynedd (1075–1081), at the Battle of Mynydd Carn in 1081, a move which earned him the epithet Fradwr, traitor, among the Welsh. In 1098, Owain participated in a massive invasion of North Wales by Hugh d’Avranches, with Hugh of Montgomery, 2nd Earl of Shrewsbury, forcing Gruffydd ap Cynan, prince of Gwynedd (1081–1137), to retreat to Anglesey. As a result of the intervention of a Norwegian army under Magnus Barelegs, the Normans suffered a defeat and withdrew most of their forces to England. Following the Norman withdrawal, Owain was left in command of a token force to control upper Gwynedd. Over the next three years, Gruffydd ap Cynan reasserted his control over Gwynedd and agreed terms with the Normans. In the meantime, Owain deserted the Normans and led a rebellion himself. He died shortly afterwards in 1105, apparently of consumption.

== Descendants ==
Owain Fradwr married Morfudd, daughter of Goronwy, son of Ednowain Bendew.

Owain's daughter, Angharad, married Gruffudd ap Cynan, Prince of Gwynedd, by whom she had three sons: Cadwallon, Owain Gwynedd (the first Welsh prince to take the title Princeps Wallensium, Prince of the Welsh) and Cadwaladr ap Gruffydd.

His sons were Goronwy, Meilir, Llywelyn, Aldud, and Rhirid. Goronwy was the father of the Cristin who was the second wife of Owain Gwynedd. However, in 1125 a son of Gruffudd ap Cynan killed all Owain's male heirs bringing the direct line of the family to an end.
