= 12th century in Wales =

- 11th century | 13th century | Other years in Wales
- Other events of the century

This article is about the particular significance of the century 1101–1200 to Wales and its people.

== Events ==
1102

- Henry I of England has a series of charges drawn up against the rebel Robert of Bellême, Earl of Shrewsbury and, when Robert refuses to answer to them, has Robert's former vassal and ally Iorwerth ap Bleddyn, prince of Powys, persuaded to besiege and capture Robert's castles in Shropshire; Iorwerth also delivers his own brother Maredudd ap Bleddyn to the king. The king banishes Robert and his brothers from England and Wales; his brother Arnulf of Montgomery, lord of Pembroke, goes to serve his father-in-law, Muirchertach Ua Briain, High King of Ireland.
- Gerald de Windsor is appointed by Henry I of England as Constable of Pembroke Castle.

1103

- Iorwerth ap Bleddyn, prince of Powys, having been insufficiently rewarded for his actions the previous year, again rebels against Henry I and is arraigned before a royal tribunal at Shrewsbury, convicted and imprisoned, leaving his brother Cadwgan ap Bleddyn as sole ruler of the parts of Powys not already in Norman hands.

1109

- Nest ferch Rhys is abducted from Cilgerran Castle by Owain ap Cadwgan, son of Cadwgan ap Bleddyn.

1110

- Cadwgan ap Bleddyn loses Ceredigion to the Norman Gilbert Fitz Richard.
- Iorwerth ap Bleddyn is released from prison.
- Philip de Braose, 2nd Lord of Bramber, rebels against King Henry I of England, and his estates are confiscated.

1111

- Madog ap Rhiryd, an ally of Owain ap Cadwgan, kills Iorwerth ap Bleddyn (Owain's nephew) through arson near Llanfair Caereinion, allowing Cadwgan ap Bleddyn (Iorwerth's brother) to return to rule all of Powys; soon afterwards, Madog also kills Cadwgan at Welshpool (Y Trallwng) so that Owain (son of Cadwgan) takes over their possessions in Powys.

1112

- Philip de Braose regains possession of the estates lost two years earlier.

1113

- Gruffydd ap Rhys of Deheubarth, heir of Rhys ap Tewdwr, returns from exile in Ireland.
- Maredudd ap Bleddyn captures Madog ap Rhiryd and sends him to Maredudd's nephew, Owain ap Cadwgan, Prince of Powys, who takes revenge for the killing of his father by having Madog's eyes gouged out.

1114

- King Henry I of England invades Gwynedd, obliging Gruffudd ap Cynan to pay homage to him.

1115

- Bernard replaces Wilfred as Bishop of St Davids, as a result of Henry I's determination to take the diocese out of Welsh control.
- Owain ap Cadwgan is knighted by King Henry I of England for his service in Normandy.
- Gruffydd ap Rhys seeks sanctuary in Gwynedd but receives no assistance from Gruffudd ap Cynan.

1116

- Revolt against the Normans, led by Gruffydd ap Rhys. He successfully attacks Swansea Castle, Carmarthen Castle, and Kidwelly Castle, but fails to take Castle Llanmyddyfri or Aberystwyth.

1119

- Bernard, Bishop of St Davids, attends the council of Reims.

1120

- 4 April – The Archbishop of Canterbury grants a request from Gruffudd ap Cynan to recognise David the Scot as Bishop of Bangor.
- May – The remains of Dubricius (Saint Dyfrig) are moved from Bangor to Llandaff.
- Canonization of Saint David is recognised by Pope Callixtus II.

1121

- April/May – Sibyl, daughter of Bernard de Neufmarché, marries Miles of Gloucester, 1st Earl of Hereford; the marriage is personally arranged by King Henry I of England.
- Robert Turberville is recorded as a principal tenant of Bernard de Neufmarché at Crickhowell.
- Walter of Gloucester enters Llanthony Priory as a monk; his title passes to his son Miles.

1123

- Bernard, Bishop of St Davids, visits Rome.

1124

- Cadwallon ap Gruffydd kills the three rulers of the cantref of Dyffryn Clwyd, Meilyr ab Owain, Rhiryd ab Owain and Gronw ab Owain, his maternal uncles, to annexe it to his father's Kingdom of Gwynedd.

1125

- Bernard, Bishop of St Davids, ejects the Benedictines from Carmarthen, replacing them with the Augustinian order.
- David, Bishop of Bangor, visits the Archbishop of Canterbury at Lambeth.

1127

- Bishop Urban of Llandaff unsuccessfully seeks support from the Council of Westminster to extend the boundaries of his diocese from the River Tawe to the River Towy.
- Gruffydd ap Rhys of Deheubarth goes into a brief exile in Ireland.
- Caradog ap Iestyn of Glamorgan, and his brothers Gruffydd and Goronwy are involved in a “deed of violence”.

1128

- 19 April - Bishop Urban of Llandaff seeks support from the Pope for the extension of his diocese.

1129

- Bishop Urban of Llandaff makes a second appeal to the Pope. Bishop Bernard of St Davids follows him to Rome and obtains a deferment of the decision.
- Bledri ap Cydifor makes a grant of land to Carmarthen Priory.
- Richard I de Grenville makes a grant of land to the Congregation of Savigny for foundation of Neath Abbey; the first monks arrive in 1130.
- The name of Geoffrey of Monmouth appears on the charter of Osney Abbey in Oxfordshire.
- Penhow Castle is first known to be occupied.

1130

- Robert de Bethune, prior of Llanthony, is made Bishop of Hereford by King Henry I of England.
- Construction of Painscastle by Pain fitzJohn.

1131

- 9 May - Tintern Abbey is founded.
- Bernard, Bishop of St Davids, is present at a second council of Reims. His cathedral at St Davids receives a “dedication”, possibly indicating a partial rebuilding.

1132

- Basingwerk Abbey is founded.
- Madog ap Maredudd succeeds his father as ruler of Powys.

1133

- Cadwallon ap Gruffydd is defeated and killed by an army of the Kingdom of Powys near Nanheudwy.

1135

- Monks of Llanthony Priory are forced by persistent attacks from the local population to flee across the English border and establish a daughter cell, Llanthony Secunda.
- Geoffrey of Monmouth gives permission to Caradog of Llancarfan to use material from his History of the Kings of Britain. Ordericus Vitalis quotes from Geoffrey's work in his Historia Ecclesiastica.

1136

- January - Rebellion breaks out in Ceredigion. Owain Gwynedd and his brother Cadwaladr ap Gruffydd invade the region and take five of its castles, including Aberystwyth.
- Gwenllian ferch Gruffydd is killed in battle near Kidwelly.
- September/October - Battle of Crug Mawr; a signal victory for the Welsh.
- Cardigan Castle is taken by the Welsh and burned.
- Llanthony Secunda Priory is founded by Miles of Gloucester, 1st Earl of Hereford.

1137

- Death of Gruffudd ap Cynan, king of Gwynedd; he is replaced by Owain Gwynedd.
- Owain and his brother Cadwaladr ap Gruffydd ap Cynan complete their conquest of Ceredigion by capturing the castles in the east and south of the region.
- William of Wycombe becomes prior of Llanthony Priory.

1138

- A shrine to St Winefride is established in Shrewsbury, and the saint's remains are transferred there from Holywell.
- Owain Gwynedd and Cadwaladr ap Gruffydd ap Cynan fail to take Cardigan with the aid of a Danish fleet. Their allies include Anarawd ap Gruffydd and his brother Cadell. Cadwaladr consolidates their previous gains and retains control of northern Ceredigion.
- King Stephen of England gives Gilbert de Clare the title of Earl of Pembroke.

1139

- Owain Gwynedd places southern Ceredigion under the control of his son Hywel ab Owain Gwynedd.
- Owain and his brother Cadwaladr oppose the appointment of Meurig to the see of Bangor. They are supported by Anarawd ap Gruffydd.

1140

- January - Meurig is consecrated Bishop of Bangor.
- 16 September – Whitland Abbey is founded at Little Trefgarn near Haverfordwest by monks from Clairvaux.

1141

- 2 February – Cadwaladr ap Gruffydd ap Cynan is an ally of Earl Randolph of Chester in his attack on Lincoln.
- Ewenny Priory is founded.

1143

- Following the murder of Anarawd ap Gruffydd by supporters of Cadwaladr ap Gruffydd ap Cynan, Owain Gwynedd and his son Hywel drive Cadwaladr out of Ceredigion.
- Gilbert is appointed Bishop of St Asaph.

1144

- Bernard, Bishop of St Davids, gives land at Trefgarn to the first Cistercian monks to settle in west Wales.
- Cadwaladr ap Gruffydd ap Cynan brings a Danish fleet to Abermenai from his Irish allies; the Danes are driven out by his brother Owain Gwynedd. Cadwaladr is reconciled with Owain and restored to Ceredigion.
- Hugh de Mortimer recaptures Maelienydd and Elfael from the Welsh.

1145

- Hywel ab Owain Gwynedd and his brother Cynan sack Cardigan but fail to take the castle.
- Hugh de Mortimer captures a local leader, Rhys ap Hywel.
- Gilbert de Clare, 1st Earl of Pembroke, fortifies the castle of “Dinwileir”.

1146

- Owain Gwynedd takes Mold from Ranulf de Gernon, 4th Earl of Chester.
- Cadell ap Gruffydd takes the castle of Dinwileir from Gilbert de Clare, 1st Earl of Pembroke. With help from Hywel ab Owain Gwynedd, he also takes the castles of Carmarthen and Llansteffan. Rhys ap Gruffydd (the Lord Rhys) begins his military career, aged 13, fighting under his brother Cadell.
- Hugh de Mortimer brings about the death of Maredudd ap Madog ab Idnerth.

1147

- In alliance with Hywel ab Owain Gwynedd and the Fitzgeralds of Pembroke, Cadell ap Gruffydd takes the castle of Wiston from Walter Fitzwiz.
- Hywel ab Owain Gwynedd and his brother Cynan invade Meirionnydd and take the castle of Cynfail from their uncle, Cadwaladr ap Gruffydd ap Cynan.
- Margam Abbey founded.

1148

- 19 December – David FitzGerald is consecrated Bishop of St Davids, at Canterbury.

1149

- Madog ap Maredudd mounts an expedition into England and takes the Fitzalan lordship of Oswestry. He appoints his nephew Owain Cyfeiliog to rule Cyfeiliog on his behalf.
- Tegeingl and Iâl are annexed by Owain Gwynedd.

1150

- Cadell ap Gruffydd launches a raid on Kidwelly.
- Cynan ab Owain Gwynedd is imprisoned by his father Owain Gwynedd, for unspecified reasons.
- Hywel ab Owain Gwynedd captures his cousin Cadfan, son of Cadwaladr ap Gruffydd ap Cynan, and occupies the new castle at Llanrhystud.
- Bertha of Hereford marries William de Braose, 3rd Lord of Bramber.

1151

- Cadell ap Gruffydd is attacked by Normans while hunting in the forest of Coed Rhath. Although he survives the attack, he is unable to continue his military activities.

1152

- 21 February - Geoffrey of Monmouth is consecrated Bishop of St Asaph, ten days after being ordained a priest.
- Another quarrel takes place between Owain Gwynedd and his brother Cadwaladr; Cadwaladr goes into exile in England.

1153

- Cadell ap Gruffydd makes a pilgrimage to Rome. His brothers Maredudd and Rhys ap Gruffydd drive Hywel ab Owain Gwynedd out of Ceredigion.
- Rhys ap Gruffydd attacks the territory of Owain Cyfeiliog, beginning a feud between the two princes, and captures the Norman castle at St Clears.

1154

- Morgan ab Owain, grandson of Caradog ap Gruffydd, is recognised as lord of Caerleon by King Henry II of England.

1155

- The sudden death of Maredudd ap Gruffydd leaves his brother Rhys sole ruler of Deheubarth.

1157

- King Henry II of England invades Wales, with the support of Madog ap Maredudd, attacking Anglesey by sea. Following a highly successful ambush in Hawarden Woods (led by Owain's sons Dafydd and Cynan) near Ewloe in north-east Wales, Owain Gwynedd repulsed Henry II's army, his forces scattering in disarray and his royal standard was thrown to the ground; a symbol of surrender in those times. The standard bearer was later killed in a judicial duel connected to this humiliating retreat. King Henry escaped with his life but had suffered a humiliating set back. Realising that further confronting the Plantagenet king would be a highly risky affair, the subsequent peace agreement between Henry and Owain saw the latter buy peace with a certain number of cattle and, although he also cedes Tegeingl to Henry; it is recovered into Welsh hands in the late 1160s. Owain is also made to return his brother Cadwaladr to his former position.

1158

- Rhys ap Gruffydd is forced to pay homage to King Henry II of England; Rhys temporarily loses Ceredigion and part of Ystrad Tywi.
- Ifor Bach makes a fatal attack on Morgan ab Owain of Caerleon; Morgan is succeeded by his brother Iorwerth. Later in the year, Ifor captures William, Earl of Gloucester, and his family from Cardiff Castle and holds them hostage pending the restoration of his own former lands.

1159

- An alliance of English earls and some Welsh leaders (including Cadwaladr ap Gruffydd ap Cynan, Hywel ab Owain Gwynedd and Cynan ab Owain Gwynedd) unsuccessfully attempts to overthrow Rhys ap Gruffydd.

1160

- Following the death of Madog ap Maredudd, prince of Powys, at Whittington, Powys is permanently divided into two and shared between his sons, including Gruffydd Maelor, Owain Brogyntyn and Owain Cyfeiliog.

1162

- 3 June – David FitzGerald, Bishop of St Davids, and Nicholas ap Gwrgant, Bishop of Llandaff, assist in the consecration of Thomas Becket as Archbishop of Canterbury.

1163

- 19 May - David FitzGerald, Bishop of St Davids, attends a council of Pope Alexander III at Tours.
- Owain Cyfeiliog and his cousin Owain Fychan capture and destroy the royal castle of Carreghofa.
- Owain Gwynedd musters an assembly of Welsh leaders at Corwen, in opposition to King Henry II of England, which is attended by Owain's brother Cadwaladr. Cadwallon ap Madog and his brother Einion ap Madog, Owain Cyfeiliog and others. Owain Gwynedd also begins diplomacy with France - the first Welsh ruler known to have done so.

1164

- 30 January - David FitzGerald, Bishop of St Davids, is among the signatories of the Constitutions of Clarendon.
- Strata Florida Abbey is founded.

1165

- King Henry II of England invades Wales via Oswestry; Owain Gwynedd gathers an army composed of the forces of several of the other native rulers of Wales and camps at Corwen. After a few skirmishes, Henry withdraws up Berwyn mountain for security and eventually felly retreats to England without fighting. Although Henry cites bad weather as the reason for his withdrawal, the Welsh troops, under the same skies, remained in the field; from now on, Owain is considered prince of Wales. This was a signal success for Owain and was recorded as such by contemporary English chronicler, John of Salisbury. Similarly, Owain's successes against Henry are mentioned in the diplomatic messages exchanged with the French king, Louis VII.
- Cardigan Castle is captured and Robert Fitz-Stephen is taken prisoner by the Lord Rhys of Deheubarth.

1165

- Cardigan Castle is taken by Rhys ap Gruffydd and destroyed. Its constable Robert Fitzstephen becomes Rhys's prisoner.
- Dafydd ab Owain Gwynedd makes a successful raid on Tegeingl.

1167

- Owain Gwynedd and his brother Cadwaladr take the castles of Rhuddlan and Prestatyn.
- David Fitzgerald, Bishop of St Davids, persuades Rhys ap Gruffydd to release Robert Fitzstephen (David's half-brother).
- Owain Cyfeiliog, having entered into an alliance with the English, loses the commote of Caereinion when he is attacked by joint forces of Owain Gwynedd and Rhys ap Gruffydd.

1170

- November - The death of Owain Gwynedd throws his former kingdom into disarray and causes a power struggle in Gwynedd; within weeks, his nominated heir is dead, and his son Dafydd ab Owain assumes power. Dafydd is, however, unable to maintain his father's hold on south Wales, which falls under the aegis of Rhys ap Gruffydd.
- Court poet Cynddelw Brydydd Mawr produces his well-known elegy to Owain.
- Owain Cyfeiliog establishes the Cistercian monastery of Strata Marcella.
- Peter de Leia becomes Prior of Much Wenlock.
- According to folklore, Madoc (Owain's illegitimate son) sails from Wales to America.

1171

- September - The Lord Rhys negotiates a lasting peace with King Henry II of England.
- October - King Henry II of England makes a pilgrimage to St Davids.
- Iorwerth ab Owain, having fallen out of favour with King Henry II, loses the lordship of Caerleon.

1172

- Philip de Braose is given the “honour” of Limerick, in recognition of his service to the English king in Ireland.
- Gerald of Wales completes his studies at the University of Paris and returns to Britain. He is soon commissioned by the Archbishop of Canterbury to enforce the payment of tithes on wool and cheese in the Diocese of St Davids. In the same year David Fitzgerald, the bishop, is granted a royal charter confirming all his possessions.
- Following the death of his son Owain at the hands of the Earl of Gloucester, Iorwerth ab Owain rebels against Norman rule.

1173

- Maelgwn ab Owain Gwynedd, one of the sons of Owain Gwynedd, is driven into exile in Ireland by his brother Dafydd. Dafydd sides with the King of England against the Welsh rebels and seeks the hand of Henry's half-sister Emma of Anjou in return for his assistance.
- Iorwerth ab Owain and his son take Caerleon and other castles in Gwent.

1174

- Maelgwn ab Owain Gwynedd returns from exile and is imprisoned by his brother Dafydd, who proceeds to eliminate all opposition to his rule in Gwynedd, including his brothers Rhodri, Cynan and Iorwerth Drwyndwn; Cynan and Iorwerth are both believed to have died during this year. Dafydd marries Emma of Anjou during the summer.
- Richard de Clare, 2nd Earl of Pembroke, takes Usk Castle.

1175

- 18 May – David FitzGerald, Bishop of St Davids, attends the council of Richard, Archbishop of Canterbury in London, in the presence of King Henry II of England and Henry the Young King.
- 12 October – Adam Parvipontanus is consecrated as Bishop of St Asaph following the resignation of the long-absent Godfrey.
- Christmas – Abergavenny Massacre: William de Braose, 4th Lord of Bramber, summons Seisyll ap Dyfnwal and other Welsh leaders to his seat at Abergavenny Castle under pretence of reconciliation and has them murdered.
- Cadell ap Gruffydd enters Strata Florida Abbey shortly before his death.

1176

- 11 November - Peter de Leia is consecrated as Bishop of St Davids, despite the chapter's expressed preference for Gerald of Wales.
- December - An eisteddfod of bards and musicians is held at Cardigan Castle, to celebrate Christmas. It is for this occasion that Gwynfardd Brycheiniog's awdl in honour of the Lord Rhys is thought to have been composed.
- Following the death of the last of the sons of Miles de Gloucester, his lands are divided between his daughters, including Bertha, wife of William de Braose. William thus acquires the lordships of Brecon and Abergavenny.
- Cwmhir Abbey is re-established under the patronage of Cadwallon ap Madog and his brother Einion.

1177

- May - At the Council of Oxford, Dafydd ab Owain Gwynedd is given the lordships of Ellesmere and Hales in Shropshire by his brother-in-law King Henry II of England. Owain Cyfeiliog is also present at the Council.
- Robert Fitzstephen is given a joint grant of the kingdom of Cork, where he settles.

1179

- Llantarnam Abbey is founded by the Cistercians, as a daughter house of Strata Florida Abbey.
- Adam Parvipontanus, Bishop of St Asaph, attends the Lateran Council in Rome.
- Roger Mortimer of Wigmore is imprisoned by King Henry II of England for his part in the death of Cadwallon ap Madog.

1180

- The Life of St Kentigern (Mungo), written about this time by Jocelyn of Furness, contains the only known account of the life of Saint Asaph.

1183

- Gerald of Wales visits Ireland, with his brother Philip.
- A rising in Glamorgan is led by Morgan ap Caradog ap Iestyn.

1184

- Peter de Leia is nominated as Archbishop of Canterbury, but not selected.

1185

- Benedictine priory at Llandovery dissolved and town established.
- Gerald of Wales is selected to accompany Prince John to Ireland.

1186

- Maenan Abbey is founded near Conwy.

1187

- Siege of Tenby by Maelgwn ap Rhys.

1188

- Gerald of Wales accompanies Baldwin, Archbishop of Canterbury, on a journey through Wales to recruit volunteers for the Third Crusade, recorded in his Itinerarium Kambriae. The only Welsh ruler who refuses to support the visit is Owain Cyfeiliog, who is excommunicated for his failure to cooperate.

1189

- At the urging of his son Gruffydd, Rhys ap Gruffydd imprisons his illegitimate son Maelgwn ap Rhys. Gruffydd marries Matilda de Braose, the daughter of Maud de Braose and of William de Braose, 4th Lord of Bramber.

1190

- Rhys ap Gruffydd annexes the Norman lordships of Cydweli and Carnwyllion.

1192

- Maelgwn ap Rhys is released from captivity by his father, Rhys ap Gruffydd.

1194

- Llywelyn the Great defeats his uncle Dafydd ab Owain Gwynedd at the Battle of Aberconwy and assumes control of Gwynedd.
- Rhys ap Gruffydd is defeated in battle by his sons Maelgwn ap Rhys and Hywel ap Rhys, and is imprisoned at Nevern Castle.

1195

- Owain Cyfeiliog abdicates in favour of his son Gwenwynwyn.
- Rhys Gryg and Maredudd ap Rhys are imprisoned by their father, Rhys ap Gruffydd, for seizing the territories of Llanymddyfri and Dinefwr.

1196

- Rhys ap Gruffydd launches his last campaign against the Normans, capturing several castles and defeating Roger Mortimer of Wigmore near Radnor.

1199

- 6 January - Cwmhir Abbey is officially founded by a charter of Llywelyn the Great.
- date unknown - First mention of a church on the site of St Mary's Church, Aberavon.

1200

- Giles de Braose becomes Bishop of Hereford.

== Books ==
- Geoffrey of Monmouth
  - Historia Regum Britanniae (1136)
  - Vita Merlini (1148)
- Gerald of Wales
  - Topographia Hibernica (1188)
  - Itinerarium Cambriae (1191)
  - Descriptio Cambriae (1194)
- Thomas of Monmouth
  - The Life and Miracles of William (1173)

== Births ==
1132

- date unknown - The Lord Rhys, ruler of Deheubarth (d. 1197)

1146

- approximate - Gerald of Wales, cleric and topographer (d. c.1223)

1173

- probable - Llywelyn the Great (d. 1240)

== Deaths ==
1101

- 27 July - Hugh d'Avranches, 1st Earl of Chester

1107

- March - Robert Fitzhamon, conqueror of Glamorgan

1111

- date unknown
  - Cadwgan ap Bleddyn, prince of Powys
  - Iorwerth ap Bleddyn, prince of Powys

1115

- date unknown - Gilbert Fitz Richard, lord of Cardigan

1116

- date unknown - Owain ap Cadwgan, prince of Powys

1120

- 25 November - Richard d'Avranches, 2nd Earl of Chester, 26 (drowned in the White Ship)

1129

- date unknown
  - Richard Fitz Pons, Marcher lord
  - Walter de Gloucester, Marcher official

1132

- date unknown - Maredudd ap Bleddyn, prince of Powys

1134

- 10 February - Robert II, Duke of Normandy, about 83 (in prison at Cardiff Castle)
- date unknown - Urban, Bishop of Llandaff

1136

- date unknown - Gwenllian ferch Gruffydd, princess of Deheubarth, about 36 (killed in battle)

1137

- April/May - Gruffydd ap Rhys, Prince of Deheubarth, about 56
- 10 July - Pain fitzJohn, Anglo-Norman nobleman and administrator, about 37
- August - Ranulph de Mortimer
- date unknown - Gruffudd ap Cynan, ruler of Gwynedd

1143

- 24 December - Miles of Gloucester, 1st Earl of Hereford, Marcher lord
- date unknown - Anarawd ap Gruffydd, prince of Deheubarth

1148

- 6 January - Gilbert de Clare, 1st Earl of Pembroke

1155

- 22 September - Roger Fitzmiles, 2nd Earl of Hereford
- date unknown - Maredudd ap Gruffydd, prince of Deheubarth

1160

- date unknown - Madog ap Maredudd, Prince of Powys

1170

- 28 November - Owain Gwynedd, Prince of Gwynedd
- December - Hywel ab Owain Gwynedd, poet and Prince of Gwynedd

1172

- date unknown - Cadwaladr ap Gruffydd, prince of Gwynedd

1175

- date unknown - Cadell ap Gruffydd, Prince of Deheubarth

1176

- 1 September - Maurice FitzGerald, Lord of Lanstephan

1191

- date unknown - Gruffydd Maelor, Prince of Powys Fadog

1195

- date unknown - Rhodri ab Owain Gwynedd, prince of Gwynedd

1197

- 28 April - The Lord Rhys, ruler of Deheubarth, about 65
- date unknown - Owain Cyfeiliog, poet and Prince of Powys

1200

- Gruffudd ap Cynan ab Owain Gwynedd, Welsh prince
