= Perfeddwlad =

Historic definition of a region in north east Wales

Coordinates: 53.287°N 3.763°W

Perfeddwlad or Y Berfeddwlad was an historic name for the territories in Wales lying between the River Conwy and the River Dee. comprising the cantrefi of Rhos, Rhufoniog, Dyffryn Clwyd and Tegeingl. Perfeddwlad thus was also known as the Four Cantrefs.

== Early history ==
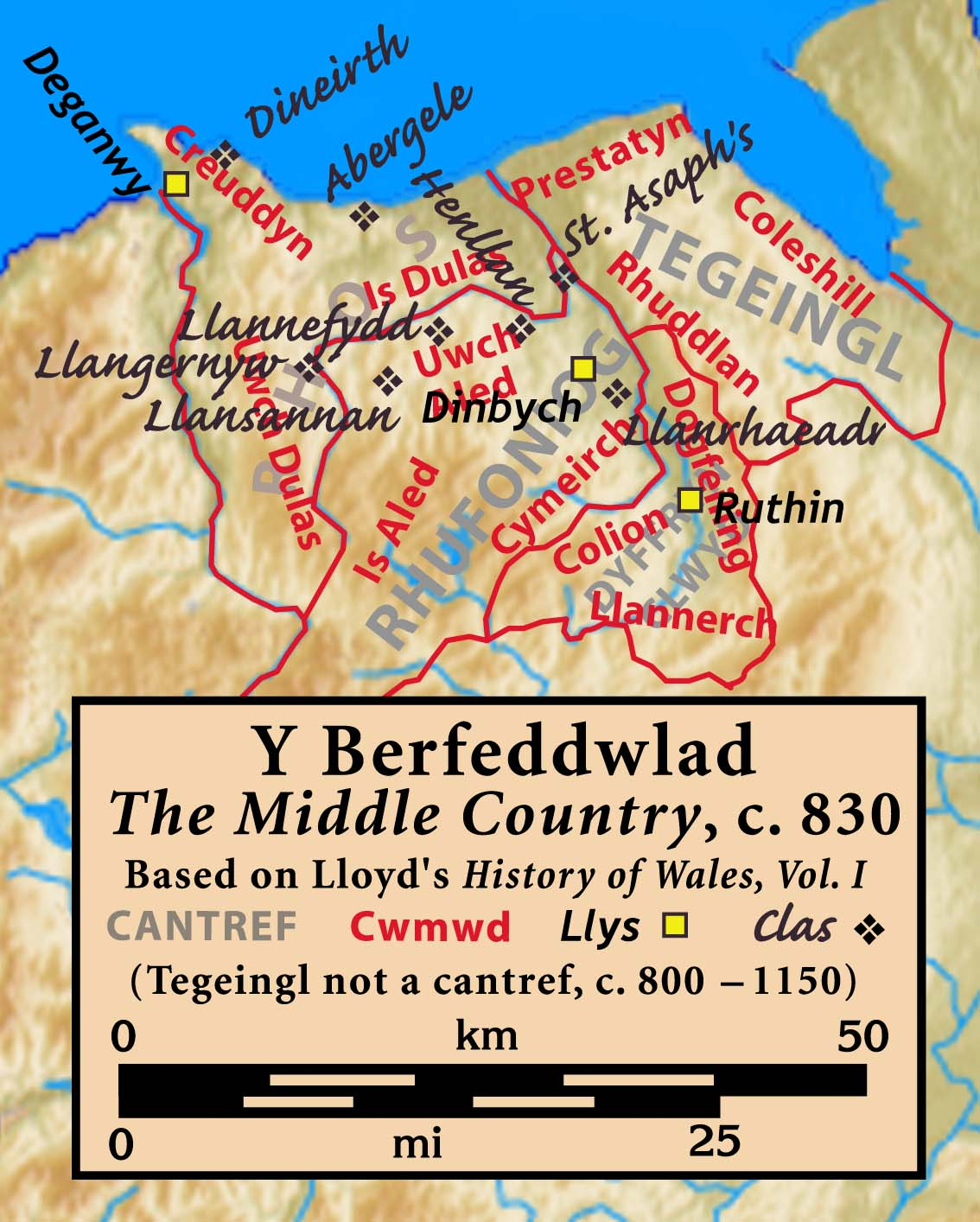
Perfeddulad

For much of its history the area had been known as Tegeingl, after the Celtic tribe Deceangli which inhabited North East Wales since the Iron Age. This was also the name of the most easterly cantref of the region. As the Kingdom of Gwynedd emerged as the dominant power in North Wales, the area also became known as Gwynedd Is Conwy (Gwynedd "below" the Conwy River).

The name Y Berfeddwlad appears in the High Middle Ages, as the rivalries between Gwynedd, Powys, and the Anglo-Saxon England (and later Normans) intensified. The name is a contraction of "Perfedd" and "gwlad" meaning heart-land or middle-country as the area became a centre of conflict.

== Later history ==
Shortly after the death of Owain, the ruling Prince of Gwynedd, his son and heir Hywel was ousted in a coup led by his stepmother; he was replaced by his step-brothers Rhodri, Maelgwn, and Dafydd, who ruled jointly. However, within a year, the ruling brothers fell into dispute, forcing Maelgwn to flee to Ireland, while Dafydd and Rhodri eventually divided Gwynedd between them; Anglesey and the Perfeddwlad went to Dafydd.

In 1194, Llywelyn Fawr, the senior heir of Owain Gwynedd (being the eldest son of Iorwerth Drwyndwn, the next eldest son of Owain Gwynedd after Hywel), defeated Dafydd in the Battle of Aberconwy, and took over the Perfeddwlad. Following Rhodri's death the following year, Gruffudd, another grandson of Owain Gwynedd by yet another son, took over the remainder of Gwynedd; when Gruffudd died in 1200, Llywelyn inherited these lands as well.

Llywelyn's expansionist conflicts with Reginald de Braose, William Marshal, and Powys Wenwynwyn, lead to his dominance of Wales, but following his death, his brother-in-law, King Henry III of England, temporarily invaded the Perfeddwlad in order to force Llywelyn's son - Dafydd - to agree (by the Treaty of Gwerneigron) to limit his authority to Gwynedd. Henry took Dafydd's bastard elder brother Gruffydd hostage to ensure compliance (Gruffydd's potential release represented a threat to Dafydd, as Welsh Law allowed acknowledged bastards to inherit).

Following Gruffydd's accidental death a few years later (while trying to escape), Dafydd forged an anti-English alliance against his uncle (King Henry), resulting in a pre-emptive English invasion, in 1245. Dafydd died without heirs the next year, but the war was continued by Gruffydd's sons until 1247, when they decided to make peace with the King - the Treaty of Woodstock. The Treaty gave Henry the Perfeddwlad, which he gave to his own son (Edward), while the rest of Gwynedd was divided between Gruffydd's two adult sons (Llywelyn and Owain).

After a decade, the population of the Perfeddwlad felt that their grievances were not being adequately addressed by Edward, and appealed to Llywelyn for assistance. Llywelyn was himself already aggrieved that when Llywelyn's younger brother, Dafydd, had reached adulthood, Henry had promised to re-divide Gwynedd so that Dafydd would also have lands to rule. So it was that in late 1256 Llywelyn invaded the Perfeddwlad, and captured it. Supply-line problems led to a series of defeats for the English, who subsequently had to abandon their campaign to deal with serious conflicts between the King and his Barons. In 1269, the King's weakened authority over the whole kingdom, and Llywelyn's gains in the meantime, lead to the Treaty of Montgomery, by which Henry acknowledged Llywelyn's gain of the Perfeddwlad, and his dominance over the rest of Wales - acknowledging Llywelyn as Prince of Wales.

However, when Llywelyn married Eleanor de Montfort (in 1275), the daughter of Henry's greatest enemy, Edward - now king of England - demanded an explanation, in person. Llywelyn refused to attend, insisting he wouldn't be safe, so Edward declared him a rebel, and in 1277 attacked Gwynedd with an enormous army, seeking to depose Llywelyn entirely. Once Edward captured the Perfeddwlad and Anglesey (which provided much of the food supply for Llywelyn's troops), Llywelyn sought a peace agreement, resulting in the Treaty of Aberconwy:

- the Perfeddwlad was divided between Edward and Llywelyn's brother, Dafydd (who had taken Edward's side in the dispute)
- Llywelyn was permitted to rule the remainder of Gwynedd, Anglesey being restored to him
- the title Prince of Wales, however, was reduced simply to a label, no longer conferring any authority - all lesser rulers in Wales were released from any obligation to Llywelyn

Edward had kept the coastal Cantrefs of the Perfeddwlad, while Dafydd gained Rhufoniog and Dyffryn Clwyd. Nevertheless, by the end of 1281, the Welsh princes who had supported Edward had become disillusioned, and in early 1282 Dafydd attacked the English castles of Hawarden and Rhuddlan (which had recently been built to strengthen Edward's control of coastal Perfeddwlad), instigating sympathetic outbreaks of anti-English violence in the rest of Wales. Llywelyn decided to support his brother. Edward's reaction was fierce, the revolt was crushed, Llywelyn was killed in battle, and Dafydd was caught, tried by Edward's parliament, and (having been convicted) hung, drawn, and quartered. Gwynedd was abolished, its relics and assets taken to Westminster, and Dafydd's sons were imprisoned for life.

Following the consequent Statute of Rhuddlan, in 1284,

- Rhos and Rhufoniog were combined to form the new lordship of Denbigh and conferred upon Henry de Lacy, earl of Lincoln;
- Dyffryn Clwyd became the lordship of Ruthin and was granted to Reginald de Grey;
- Tegeingl became the lordship of Englefield and the main body of the proto-county of Flint, under the aegis of the palatinate of Chester (Englefield had only been Welsh since the late 13th century, prior to which it had been part of Cheshire).
