= Cymer Abbey =

Ruined abbey in Gwynedd, Wales

Coordinates: 52°45′28″N 3°53′43″W

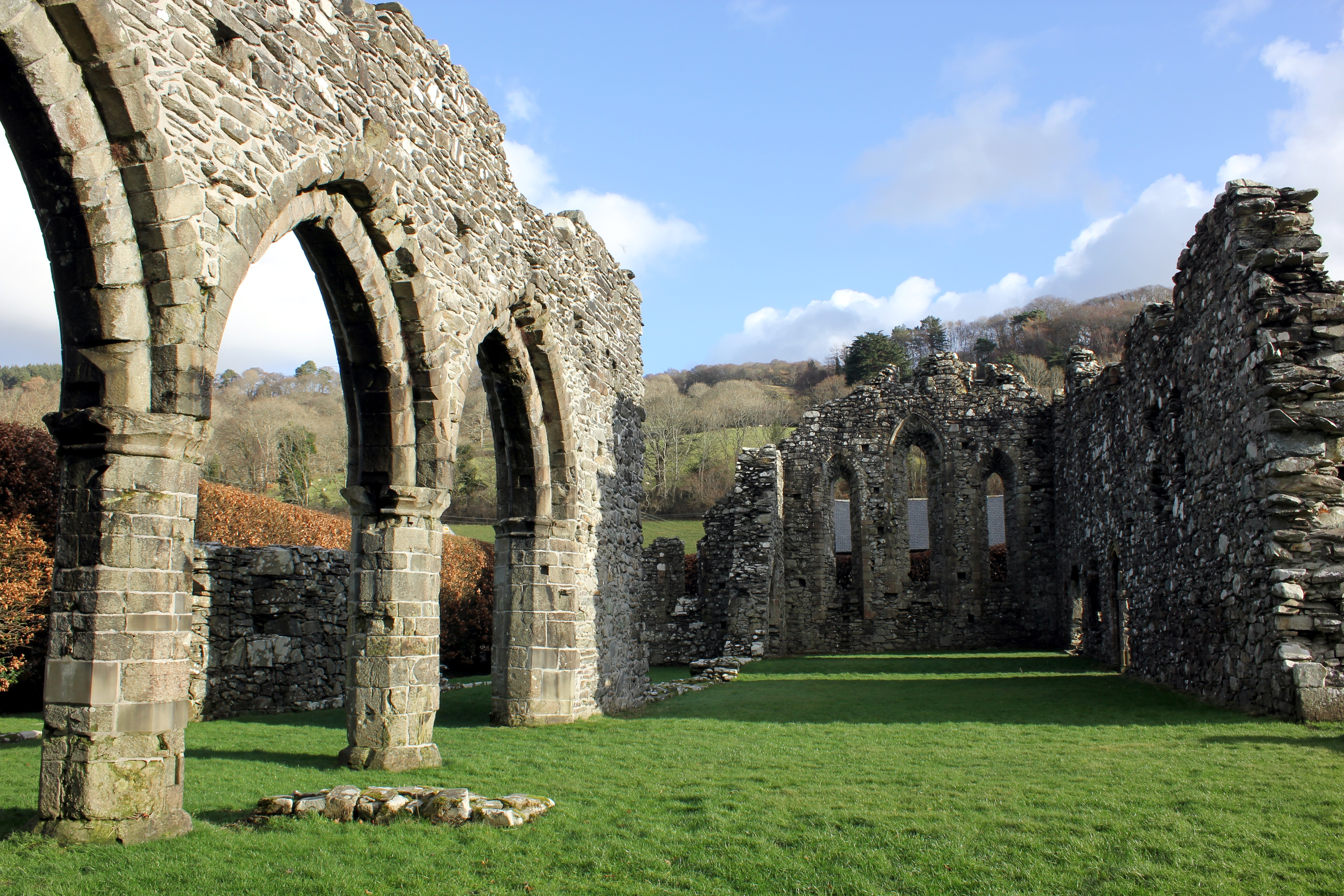
The Ruins of Cymer Abbey

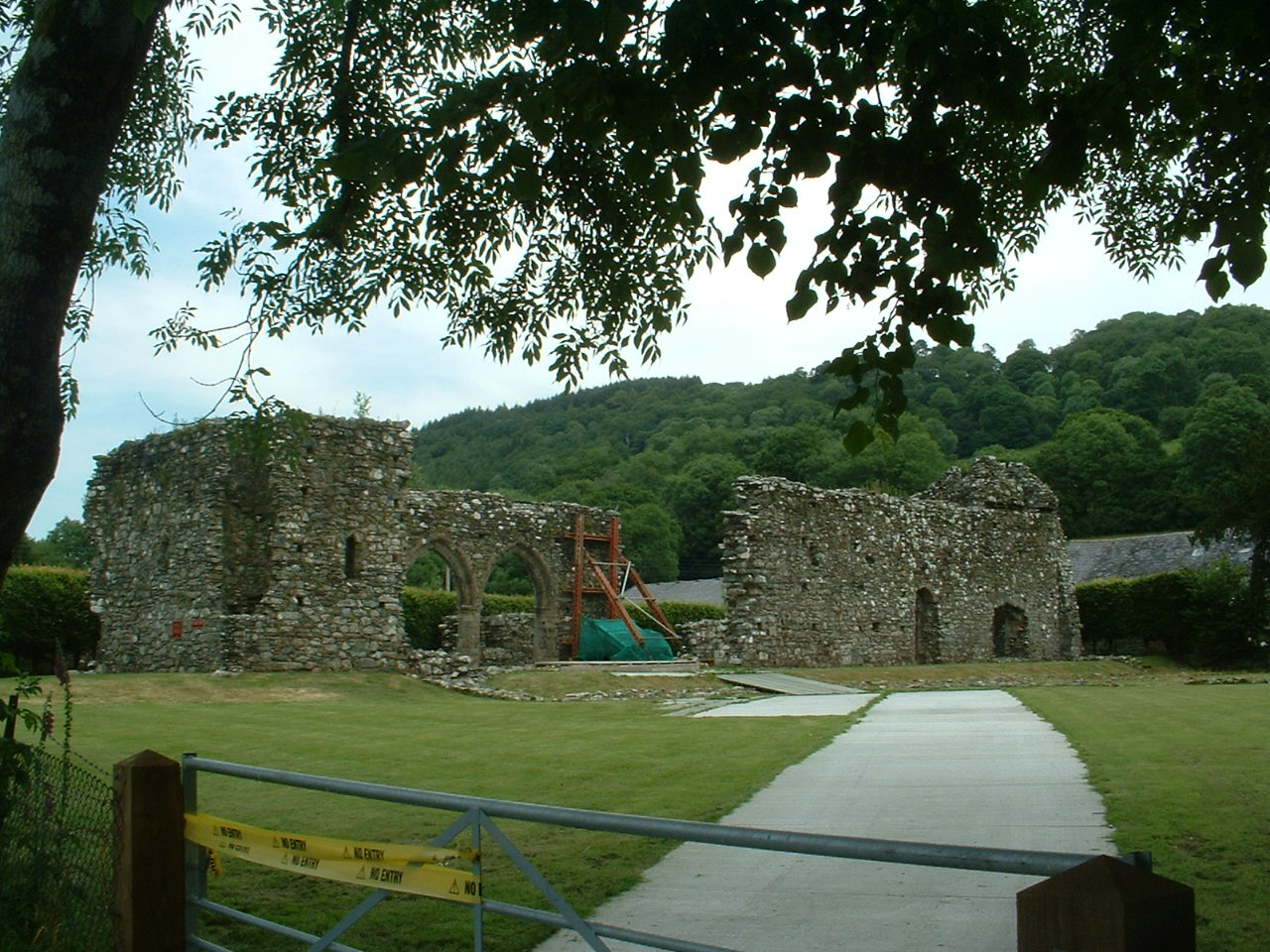
Cymer Abbey from the entrance

Cymer Abbey (Welsh: Abaty Cymer) is a ruined Cistercian abbey near the village of Llanelltyd, just north of Dolgellau, Gwynedd, in north-west Wales, United Kingdom.

== History ==
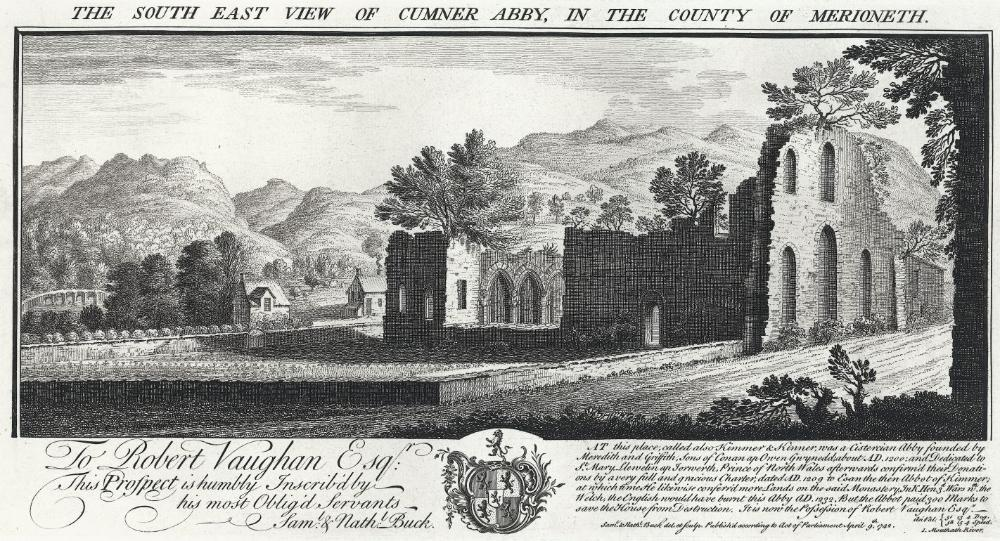
The South East View Of Cumner Abby, In The County Of Merioneth

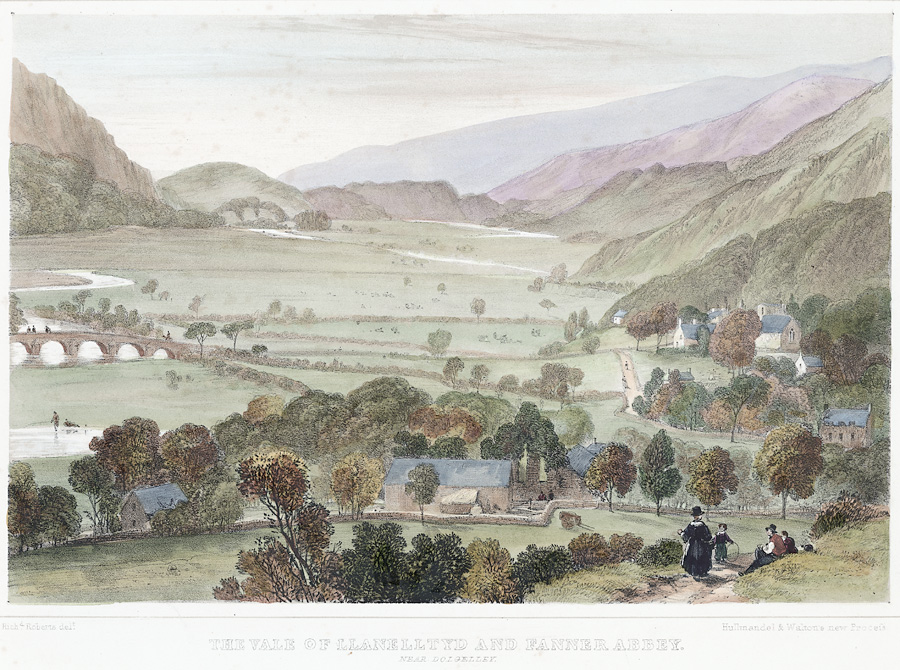
The Vale of Llanelltyd and Fanner i.e. Cymer Abbey, near Dolgelley

It was founded in 1189 and dedicated to the Virgin Mary under the patronage of Maredudd ap Cynan ab Owain Gwynedd (d. 1212), Lord of Merioneth (grandson of Owain Gwynedd), and of his brother, Gruffudd ap Cynan, prince of North Wales (d. 1200). It was a daughter house of Cwmhir Abbey in Powys.

The remains of the church and west tower are very plain, but substantial with walls surviving about nave archway height. It is a simple nave with aisles, lacking northern and southern transepts, and the choir and presbytery are incorporated into the nave. The abbey has buff sandstone dressings and some red sandstone carvings, but is primarily of local rubble construction. The foundations of the cloister and other monastic buildings are visible to the south. The abbot's house remain to the west of the site and have been extensively remodelled as a farmhouse.

Like other Cistercian communities in Wales, Cymer Abbey farmed sheep and bred horses, supplying them to Llywelyn ap Iorwerth, Llewelyn the Great. Llewelyn gifted the Abbey mining rights in 1209. However, despite this the Abbey was not prosperous: it lacked much arable land and had limited fishing rights. In 1291, annual income was £28 8s 3d. The Welsh Wars of Edward I (1276–77 and 1282–83) probably contributed to the abbey's relative poverty, for instance the failure to build the usual Cistercian central tower is one indication of this, while Alun John Richards argues that the cooler climate of the 14th century unduly affected the Abbey's lands which were largely mountainous.

The Abbey was a base for the troops of Prince Llywelyn ap Gruffudd in 1275 and 1279. In 1283 Edward I occupied the Abbey and a year later gave the Abbey compensation of £80 for damage caused in the recent wars.

By 1388 the monastery was home to no more than five monks and it seems that there was a marked decline in the standard of religious observance. In the survey of 1535, the annual income of the house was valued at little over £51 and the abbey was dissolved with the smaller monasteries in 1536–37, most likely in March 1537. The monastery was small and relatively unimportant. However, Cymer did possess a fine, thirteenth century silver gilt chalice and paten (Eucharist plate), which must have been hidden at the Dissolution; rediscovered in 1898, under a stone at Cym-y-mynach, they are now in the National Museum of Wales in Cardiff.

A small stream runs south of the cloister, and the site is on the banks of the River Mawddach and lies just above the confluence of the River Wnion with the Mawddach Cymer; and therefore the monastery was given the full title of Kymer deu dyfyr, which means 'the meeting of the waters'. It was sited at the lowest ford across the Mawddach.

It is now in the care of Cadw. As with other monastic sites in England and Wales, the abbey did not survive the Dissolution of the 1530s, and parts of the fabric were recycled for their dressed stone. Situated next to the surviving farm, the remaining ruins are open to the public on most days of the year.
