= Angharad ferch Llywelyn =

Daughter of Llywelyn ab Iorwerth

Angharad ferch Llywelyn (fl. 1260) was a daughter of Llywelyn ab Iorwerth, Prince of Wales. The identity of her mother is uncertain; but several later genealogical sources, including Pedigrees of Some Of the Emperor Charlemagne's Descendants, Volume III, compiled by J. Orton Buck and Timothy Field Beard, give Llywelyn's consort Joan, daughter of King John of England, as her mother.

Angharad is almost absent from contemporary records; however, she is mentioned in a document dated 1260, the year of her death and in sources recorded as married to Maelgwn Fychan.

She married Maelgwn Fychan of Deheubarth, a descendant of the Lord Rhys, and had four children:

1. Rhys (?–1255) – betrothed to Isabel Marshal, the illegitimate daughter of Gilbert Marshal, Earl of Pembroke.
2. Gwenllian (?–1254) – married Maredudd ap Llywelyn of Meirionydd, son of Llywelyn the Elder ap Maredudd ap Cynan ab Owain Gwynedd (sometimes called "Llywelyn Fawr").
3. Marered (? – 28 September 1255) – married Owain ap Maredudd of Cydewain.
4. Eleaonor of Ceredigion – married Maredudd ap Owain of Deheubarth, son of Owain ap Gruffydd.

Marared's daughter Angharad married Eleaonor's son Owain. Llywelyn, the son of this union, supposedly married Eleanor of Bar, an alleged daughter of Eleanor of England (King Edward I's daughter) and Henry the Count of Bar. The son of Llywelyn was Thomas (or Tomos) ap Llywelyn, among whose children were the sisters Ellen and Margaret; Ellen was the mother of Owain Glyndŵr, while Margaret married Tudur ap Goronwy, from whom the House of Tudor descend (Margaret thus being the great-great-grandmother of King Henry VII).

== Sources ==
- Huw Pryce (ed.), Acts of Welsh Rulers 1120–1283 (Cardiff, 2005), p. 202.
- Visitation of Shropshire 1623 by R Tresswell Somerset Herald with other sources of years 1569 & 1584
- Frederick Lewis Weis, Walter Lee Sheppard, Ancestral roots of certain American colonists who came to America before 1700 (2008).
