= Llywelyn Fawr ap Maredudd =

13th-century lord of Meirionnydd

Llywelyn Fawr ('the Elder') ap Maredudd ap Cynan ab Owain Gwynedd was a Welsh noble and second cousin of Gruffudd ap Llywelyn and Dafydd ap Llywelyn of the royal house of Gwynedd in the 13th century.

Llywelyn's father was Maredudd ap Cynan ab Owain Gwynedd, who fought alongside his brother Gruffudd in an alliance with Llywelyn ab Iorwerth to depose their uncle Dafydd in 1195. Llywelyn Fawr was Lord of Meirionnydd, and the cantref was confirmed to be in his possession by Henry III of England in 1241. A fellow member of the Merfynion Dynasty, Llywelyn Fawr fought on the side of his second cousin Dafydd ap Llywelyn ab Iorwerth in 1245.

Llywelyn Fawr ap Maredudd had a younger brother also called Llywelyn, who is sometimes referred to as Llywelyn Fychan ('the Younger'). Very little is known about Llywelyn Fawr ap Maredudd except that he had a son called Maredudd. Llywelyn Fawr's great-grandson Madog ap Llywelyn was the leader of the revolt of 1294.

== Bibliography ==
- Pierce, Thomas Jones. "LLYWELYN FAWR and LLYWELYN FYCHAN (fl. early 13th century). lords of Merioneth". Dictionary of Welsh Biography. National Library of Wales.
