= Daniel ap Llosgwrn Mew =

Welsh poet

- Occupation: Poet
- Writing career
- Genres: Awdl, englynion

Daniel ap Llosgwrn Mew was a Welsh poet. He is known to have written awdl style poetry, and englynion. An elegy, which takes the form of a series of englynion on Gruffudd ap Cynan ab Owain Gwynedd (d. 1200) and which is thought to have been written by him, appears in the 'Red Book of Hergest' (a 14th-century compilation of Welsh poetry and prose).
