= Llywelyn ap Maredudd =

Welsh prince and Lord of Meirionnydd

Llywelyn ap Maredudd (died 1263) was a minor Welsh prince of the House of Gwynedd who was the last vassal Lord of Meirionydd. He lived during the mid 13th century. He was the son of Maredudd ap Llywelyn ap Maredudd ap Cynan and was a direct descendant of Owain Gwynedd through his son Prince Cynan, Lord of Meirionydd.

Llywelyn sided with Owain and Dafydd Gwynedd against their brother Llywelyn II in the battle of Bryn Derwin in 1255. After their defeat he went into exile in England until June 1262 when he reconciled with the Prince of Wales. He died the next year on 27 April fighting against the English Marcher Lords. Llywelyn ap Maredudd was a distant cousin and contemporary of Llywelyn ap Gruffudd the last native Prince of Wales and is known to have had the following sons;

- Madog ap Llywelyn ap Maredudd
- Dafydd ap Llywelyn ap Maredudd
- Llywelyn ap Llywelyn ap Maredudd
- Maredudd ap Llywelyn ap Maredudd

His eldest son, Madog, led an uprising against English occupation between 1294-1295. He was survived by two sons whose fates are unknown.
