= Maelgwn =

Maelgwn is a Middle Welsh personal name meaning 'Princely Hound', stemming from Common Brittonic *Maglo-kunos, attested in Latin as Maglocunus. A number of Welsh kings and princes have borne the name:

- Maelgwn Gwynedd (died 547), king of Gwynedd
- Maelgwn ab Owain Gwynedd (died c. 1173), son of Owain Gwynedd and ruler of Anglesey
- Maelgwn ap Rhys (c. 1170 - 1230), son of Rhys ap Gruffydd and ruler of part of Deheubarth
