= Rhiw Llwyd =

Coordinates: 53.036°N 3.764°W

Rhiw Llwyd is the name of a High Medieval lordship in Wales which was created in the Kingdom of Gwynedd in the 12th century for Tomas ap Rhodri ab Owain Gwynedd and his successors. The location of this lordship is not certain but it seems likely it refers to a hill of the same name (meaning in Welsh "grey slope") between Penmachno and Ysbyty Ifan in Gwynedd. The precise spelling of the name "Rhiw Llwyd" varies in historic documents, ranging from "Friw", "Friwllwyd", "Rhiwlwyd" and others.

Rhiw Llwyd is found within the ecclesiastical parish of Penmachno and is topped with a triangulation point. It is recorded in the Anwyl family papers that "Richard Anwyll of Havodwryd, Penmachno passed his estates in Caernarvonshire to his sisters Elizabeth and Anne Anwyl". There is a 16th-century manor called Hafod Dwyryd very close to Penmachno directly beneath the hill called Rhiwlwyd - this could have been the Anwyl's disposing of their last portion of that ancient lordship.

Richard Anwyl (Sheriff of Merionethshire), son of William Lewis Anwyl is recorded as having died in 1685. The family seem to have owned Parc (their primary home) for a long time before they sold "Havodwryd". The sisters of Richard were married and their families, Owen and Roberts, then owned Havodwryd thereafter.
