= Cristin ferch Goronwy =

Welsh princess, consort of the King of Gwynedd

Cristin verch Goronwy or Christian verch Goronwy or Christiana ferch Goronwy was the second wife of Owain Gwynedd.

== Early life ==
She was born around 1105 AD in Tegeingl, Flintshire. She was the daughter of Gronwy (ap Owain) Owain and Genilles V. (Hoedlyw) Owain. She was the sister to Rymel verch (Goronwy) Gronwy. Owain ap Edwin, Lord of Tegeinel, was her grandfather.

== Marriage and family ==
She was married to Owain Gwynedd about 1145, a cousin. The church did not honor this as a true marriage.

Upon the death of her husband Owain in 1170 she supported her sons Dafydd and Rhodri in their murder of their half-brother Hywel in 1170 to get control of Owain's estate and the inheritance.

Other children of hers are Margaret ferch Owain Gwynedd, Iefan ab Owain Gwynedd, Gwenllian ferch Owain Gwynedd, and Angharad ferch Owain Gwynedd.

== Death ==
It is unknown exactly where or when she died, assumed to be someplace in the Kingdom of Gwynedd in Wales.
