= Emma of Anjou =

Princess of Gwynedd from 1174 to 1195

- Born: c. 1140
- Died: c. 1214
- Other names: Emme of Anjou, Agnes of Anjou
- Spouse(s): Dafydd ab Owain Gwynedd, King of Gwynedd
- Father: Geoffrey Plantagenet, Count of Anjou
- Relatives: Henry II of England (half-brother)

Emma (Emme, or Agnes) of Anjou (c. 1140 – c. 1214) was an illegitimate daughter of Count Geoffrey V of Anjou and half-sister of King Henry II of England. She was the wife of Dafydd ab Owain Gwynedd, a Welsh prince who was king of Gwynedd from 1170 to 1195.

== Life ==
Emma married Dafydd in the summer of 1174, after an unsuccessful rebellion by the queen, Eleanor of Aquitaine, and her older sons had led her half-brother the king to disperse Eleanor's court in Aquitaine and bring Emma back to England.

Emma had four children by Dafydd:

- Owain
- Einion
- Gwenllian
- Gwenhwyfar, (sometimes called Wennour) who married one Meurig ap Roger, the son of a Powys nobleman who had allied himself with Henry II.

In 1176, after her husband's rule in the Kingdom of Gwynedd had been challenged by his brother, Emma is known to have visited King Henry II and received a gift of manors in Shropshire and Worcestershire. After Henry's death in 1189, she continued to attempt to protect her children's interests by making representations to Henry's heirs.

In 1196, Emma and her husband, at the request of their son, Owain, gave property to Haughmond Abbey. Shortly afterwards, Dafydd was deposed by his nephew, Llywelyn the Great, and was forced into exile in England, where he died in 1203.

== Confusion ==
Emma of Anjou is occasionally confused with Emma de Laval (1200-1264), the daughter of Guy V de Laval.
