= Maredudd ap Cynan ab Owain Gwynedd =

Welsh grandson of Owain Gwynedd

Maredudd ap Cynan (c. 1150 – 1212) was the grandson of Owain Gwynedd, a king of Gwynedd and ruler of most of Wales in the 12th century. His father Cynan ab Owain Gwynedd held the title "Lord of Meirionnydd".

Maredudd is known to have fought alongside his brother Gruffudd against his uncle Hywel in 1170 and later fought on the side of his cousin Llywelyn ab Iorwerth between 1194–1197 in a campaign to depose another uncle, Dafydd. It seems likely that Maredudd inherited his father's title in Meirionnydd as a reward for his support from Llywelyn ab Iorwerth, the new ruler of Gwynedd, who would become known to posterity as Llywelyn the Great. Maredudd supported both the Augustinian and Cistercian monastic orders with grants of land and buildings. At some point he seems to have been deprived of his lands for an act of treachery.

An elegy written in the Welsh language after Maredudd's death compared him to King Arthur for his battle skills. His territories were inherited by his two sons, Llywelyn Fawr ('Llywelyn the Elder'; not to be confused with Llywelyn the Great), and Llywelyn Fychan ('Llywelyn the Younger'), who both continued to support Llywelyn the Great.
