= Cynan ab Owain Gwynedd =

Welsh prince

Cynan ab Owain Gwynedd (died 1174) was an illegitimate son of Owain Gwynedd, a Prince of the ancient Kingdom of Gwynedd, Wales. He held the title "Lord of Meirionnydd".

In the battle for the throne of Gwynedd after the death of his father, he was ultimately driven into exile in 1173 by Gwynedd's new co-rulers Dafydd and Rhodri. After Cynan's death in 1174 his sons supported his nephew Llywelyn ab Iorwerth's successful bid for the throne in 1195.
