= Rhodri ab Owain Gwynedd =

Prince of Gwynedd

- Reign: 1175 – 1195
- Predecessor: Owain Gwynedd
- Died: 1195
- Burial: Holyhead
- Dynasty: Second Dynasty of Gwynedd
- Father: Owain Gwynedd

Rhodri ab Owain Gwynedd (c. 1147 – 1195) was prince of part of Gwynedd, one of the kingdoms of medieval Wales. He ruled from 1175 to 1195.

== Start of reign ==
On the death of Owain Gwynedd on 23 November 1170, fighting broke out among his nineteen sons over the division of his kingdom. Rhodri and his brother Dafydd ab Owain Gwynedd, Owain's legitimate sons by his wife Cristin, defeated and killed their half brother Hywel ab Owain Gwynedd at Pentraeth that year. The other sons were largely killed or exiled between 1170 and 1174. Rhodri acquired part of Gwynedd, but soon afterwards lost his lands to his brother Dafydd in 1174. In 1175, Dafydd would capture and imprison him. By the end of 1175, Rhodri had escaped from captivity and was able to gain enough support to drive Dafydd out of Anglesey and the adjacent districts, making the River Conwy the boundary between them. Dafydd and Rhodri then agreed to the partition of Gwynedd between them, with Dafydd retaining only Gwynedd east of the Conwy.

== Description by Gerald of Wales ==
Rhodri and his family are mentioned in Descriptio Cambriae by Gerald of Wales which was written in c.1188 and recounts his journey around Wales raising support for the Third Crusade. In this work Gerald appears to suggest that Rhodri had made his royal home on the island – probably at Aberffraw – and gives some illuminating details about Rhodri and his young family:

"Many chosen youths of the family of Roderic (Rhodri) were seated on an opposite rock, and not one of them could be prevailed upon to take the cross, although the archbishop and others most earnestly exhorted them, but in vain, by an address particularly directed to them. It came to pass within three days, as if by divine vengeance, that these young men, with many others, pursued some robbers of that country. Being discomfited and put to flight, some were slain, others mortally wounded, and the survivors voluntarily assumed that cross they had before despised. Roderic, also, who a short time before had incestuously married the daughter of Rhys, related to him by blood in the third degree, in order, by the assistance of that prince, to be better able to defend himself against the sons of his brothers, whom he had disinherited, not paying attention to the wholesome admonitions of the archbishop on this subject, was a little while afterwards dispossessed of all his lands by their means; thus deservedly meeting with disappointment from the very source from which he expected support."
The Historical Works of Giraldus Cambrensis; The Itinerary of Wales and the Description of Wales
Translated by Sir Richard Colt-Hoare (1894), p.445

== End of reign and death ==
By the time Gerald of Wales was passing through North Wales c.1188 the young nephew of Rhodri and Dafydd, Llywelyn the Great had begun to put pressure on his uncles. Rhodri also came under pressure from his nephews Gruffydd and Maredydd ap Cynan, who drove him from Anglesey in 1190. Rhodri made an alliance with Ragnald, King of Mann and the Isles, and possibly married Ragnald's daughter. In 1193, with the help of a Manx contingent, he briefly regained Anglesey, but was ejected again the same year by Gruffydd and Maredudd. The summer of 1193 was called the "Gaelic Summer" because of the influx of Gaelic-speaking allies from the Isle of Mann to Gwynedd. Llywelyn the Great, while it is not known exactly how, had gotten very powerful by this point and with the help of Gruffydd and Maredydd ap Cynan, he deafeted Rhys in a fiercely contested battle in the Battle of Aberconwy at the mouth of the Conway. After this victory, Llywelyn the Great and his allies "won fresh triumphs" at the passage of Menai at Porthaethwy and at Coedeneu, in the heart of Anglesey. It is unclear who they fought and if Rhodri was involved in this. Rhodri ab Owain Gwynedd would die in 1195 and he is said to have been buried in Holyhead.

== Family ==
Rhodri had three known sons;

- Tomas, Lord of Rhiw Llwyd
- Gruffudd
- Einion

The descendants of Prince Tomas were claimed by Sir John Wynn as his ancestors (a claim he would later have proven in court) and by the Anwyl of Tywyn Family.

Regnal titles
Preceded by Owain I	Prince of Gwynedd; 1175–1195	Succeeded by Llywelyn ap Iorwerth
