= Maredudd ap Llywelyn ap Maredudd ap Cynan =

Welsh prince

Maredudd ap Llywelyn ap Maredudd ap Cynan was a Welsh prince, the only known son of Llywelyn Fawr ap Maredudd and a great-great-grandson of Owain Gwynedd, an important prince of north Wales in the 12th century.

This obscure Welsh prince is important in so far as his descendants outlived most of their other relatives who perished during the campaign of Edward I to subjugate Wales and destroy the royal house of Gwynedd.

Maredudd ap Llywelyn is thought to have been the vassal Lord of Meirionnydd and died in 1255. He is known to have had only one son, Llywelyn.
