= Bledri ap Cydifor =

Welsh chieftain

Bledri ap Cydifor (fl. 1116–1130), sometimes written Bleddri, was a Welsh chieftain who ruled Dyfed. He was the son of Cydifor (or Cedifor) Fawr ("the great"), a previous ruler of the same region. Bledri's sister, Ellylw, was one of the many lovers of Cadwgan ap Bleddyn, the prince of Powys, and was said to have had a child by him. Bledri ap Cydifor is sometimes confused with an earlier Bledri, who was Bishop of Llandaff in the late 10th century.

In 1113, Bledri became keeper of the "Castle of Abersafwy". According to a record in the Cartulary of Carmarthen Priory he was a "Latemeri" (interpreter), which would suggest that he (having the skills to negotiate with invaders) was a notable Welshman in the area. During the Welsh revolt of 1116 it is believed that the Normans entrusted him with the castle of Robert Courtemayn, near Carmarthen. His descendants were also prominent landowners, and may be traced to Cil Sant, Pwll Dyfach, Motlysgwm, and Picton. Bledri donated four carucates of land to the priory church of St John at Carmarthen, and the gift was confirmed by King Henry I of England in 1125.

According to Geoffrey of Monmouth, who, although his contemporary, also identified him with a legendary ruler of prehistoric times called "Bledgabred", Bledri was a man famous for his wit and skill as a story-teller. He has been touted as the possible author of early Arthurian tales in the Welsh language, including Y Seint Greal, which is thought to have been written c. 1200. He is the only Welsh story-teller of the period who is known by name. It has been suggested that Geoffrey's description of the birth of Merlin was intended as a joke at the expense of Bledri, who was closely associated with the church at Carmarthen, where he claimed Merlin had been conceived. Bledri is also referred to, under the name "Bledhericus", by Gerald of Wales, writing later in the century.
