= Maelgwn ab Owain Gwynedd =

Prince of Gwynedd

Maelgwn ab Owain Gwynedd was a prince of part of Gwynedd. Little is known about him, but he was the son of Owain Gwynedd and Gwladus ferch Llywarch ap Trahaearn, and therefore full brother to Iorwerth Drwyndwn, the father of Llywelyn the Great. On the death of Owain Gwynedd in 1170, Maelgwn received Anglesey as his share of the kingdom, but in 1173, his half brother Dafydd ab Owain Gwynedd attacked him and forced him to flee to Ireland. He returned later that same year, but was taken prisoner by Dafydd. There is no further record of his fate.

Regnal titles
Preceded by Owain Gwynedd	Prince of Gwynedd (part); 1170–1173	Succeeded by Dafydd ab Owain Gwynedd
