= Tegeingl =

Welsh medieval cantref

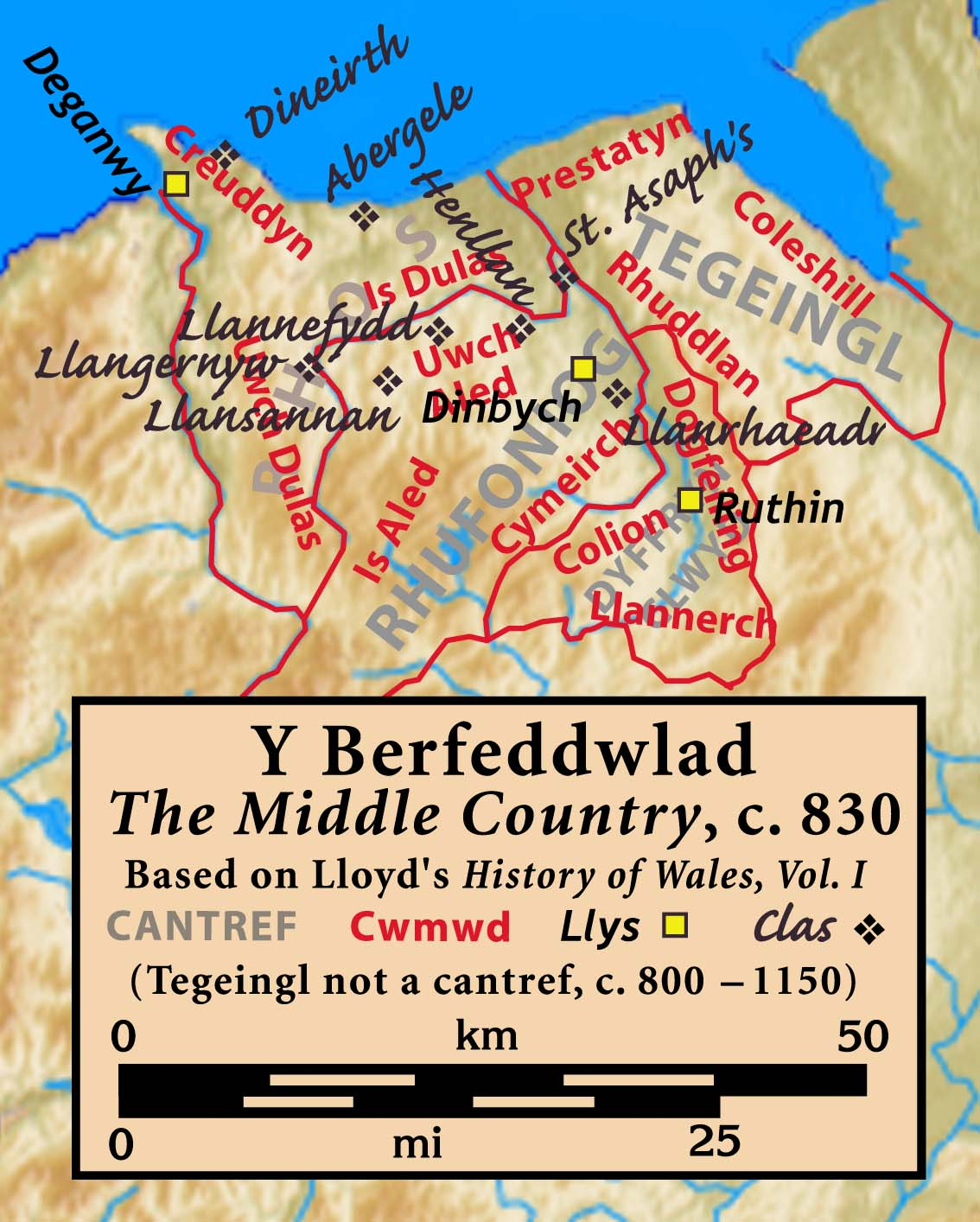

Tegeingl, known as Englefield in English, was a cantref in north-east Wales during the mediaeval period. It was incorporated into Flintshire following Edward I of England's conquest of northern Wales in the 13th century.

== Etymology ==
The region's name was derived from the Deceangli, an Iron Age Celtic tribe which had inhabited the region and attested since the 1st century BC.

== Location ==
The cantref formed the eastern part of Perfeddwlad (or Y Berfeddwlad) on the northern coast of Wales between the River Clwyd and Deeside. The territory is roughly equivalent to the modern county of Flintshire today.

== History ==
Comprising the three commotes of Rhuddlan, Prestatyn and Coleshill (Cwnsyllt), the territory originally formed part of the Kingdom of Gwynedd until, in the late 8th century, it was conquered by the Anglo-Saxon Kingdom of Mercia. It remained under Mercian (or English) control for over three centuries until Dafydd ab Owain Gwynedd recovered it in the 12th century. Edwin of Tegeingl (d.1073) was in the 11th century described as "lord" or "prince" of Tegeingl. He was succeeded as lord of Tegeingl by his son Owain who supported the Anglo-Normans' invasion of North Wales in the 1090s. The family remained powerful in North Wales until Owain's sons were killed in 1125 by a son of Gruffudd ap Cynan, Prince of Gwynedd.

It then changed hands several times between England and Gwynedd, but was eventually seized by Edward I as part of his conquest of the Principality of Wales between 1277 and 1283. It was then incorporated into the county of Flintshire by the Statute of Rhuddlan.
