= Battle of Aberconwy =

1194 battle in the Kingdom of Gwynedd

Coordinates: 53.282°N 3.828°W

The Battle of Aberconwy or the Battle of the Conwy Estuary was fought in 1194 between the forces of Llywelyn ap Iorwerth and his uncle Dafydd ab Owain Gwynedd for control of the Kingdom of Gwynedd.

Llywelyn's victory allowed him to claim the title of prince of Gwynedd and, in turn, prince of Wales.

Ejected from his lands, Dafydd went to live in England and died in 1203.
