= Dafydd ab Owain Gwynedd =

King of Gwynedd from 1170 to 1197

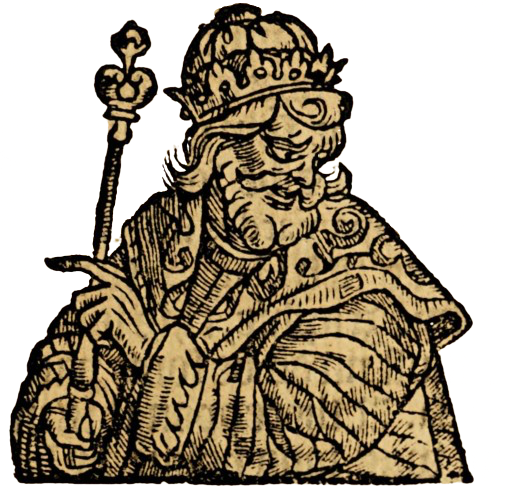
- A fanciful illustration of Dafydd from the Historie of Cambria (1584)

King of Gwynedd
- Reign: 1170–1197
- Predecessor: Hywel ab Owain Gwynedd
- Successor: Llywelyn ab Iorwerth
- Contended: Rhodri ab Owain Gwynedd; Gruffudd ap Cynan; Maredudd ap Cynan
- Died: May 1203; England
- Spouse: Emma of Anjou
- Issue: Owain; Einion; Gwenllian; Gwenhwyfar
- Dynasty: Second Dynasty of Gwynedd
- Father: Owain Gwynedd
- Mother: Cristin ferch Goronwy ab Owain

Dafydd ab Owain Gwynedd (c. 1145 – 1203) was king of Gwynedd from 1170 to 1195. For a time he ruled jointly with his brothers Maelgwn ab Owain Gwynedd and Rhodri ab Owain Gwynedd.

Dafydd was the son of Owain Gwynedd and Cristin ferch Goronwy ab Owain (married c. 1145). Since Owain and Cristin were first cousins, the marriage was not accepted by the church, which regarded Dafydd as illegitimate. Dafydd first appeared on the scene in 1157 when King Henry II of England invaded Gwynedd. Dafydd was involved in the skirmish near Basingwerk in which King Henry was nearly killed. In 1165, he was recorded as having settled in the Vale of Clwyd and as having attacked Tegeingl, gaining much plunder.

Upon the death of Owain Gwynedd in 1170, his sons fell into dispute over lordship of Gwynedd. Together, Dafydd and Rhodri attacked and killed their brother Hywel ab Owain Gwynedd that same year. Dafydd drove out Maelgwn in 1173, sending him fleeing to Ireland. Other brothers, Iorwerth Drwyndwn and Cynan ab Owain Gwynedd, were killed in 1174, removing two more contenders for the throne. The same year Dafydd captured and imprisoned his brothers Maelgwn (who had returned from Ireland) and Rhodri. He was now sole ruler of Gwynedd and that same year he married Emma (or Emme) of Anjou, the half-sister of King Henry II of England, in summer 1174. Emma was an illegitimate daughter of Geoffrey Plantagenet, Count of Anjou. They had four children:

- Owain;
- Einion;
- Gwenllian;
- Gwenhwyfar.

In 1175, Rhodri escaped and attacked his brother, seizing all Gwynedd west of the River Conwy. Dafydd was able to keep the eastern part, and in 1177, King Henry gave him the manors of Ellesmere and Hales in England. He had a castle at Rhuddlan where Gerald of Wales spent a night in 1188 on his journey round Wales with Baldwin of Forde (Archbishop Baldwin):

"Having crossed the river Conwy, or rather an arm of the sea, under Deganwy, leaving the Cistercian monastery of Conwy on the western bank of the river to our right hand, we arrived at Ruthlan, a noble castle on the river Cloyd, belonging to David, the eldest son of Owen, where, at the earnest invitation of David himself, we were handsomely entertained that night".

In 1194, Dafydd faced a new threat from his nephew, Llywelyn ap Iorwerth, who defeated him at the battle of Aberconwy with the aid of his cousins, the sons of Cynan ab Owain Gwynedd, drove him from most of his possessions and imprisoned him in 1197. He was released a year later thanks to the efforts of Hubert Walter, Archbishop of Canterbury. Dafydd retired to the Kingdom of England, where he died in May 1203. Emma died in or after 1214, when she disappears from the Pipe Rolls.

== Sources ==
- Giraldus Cambrensis (1863). The historical works of Giraldus Cambrensis containing the Topography of Ireland, and the History of the conquest of Ireland, tr. by T. Forester. The Itinerary through Wales, and the Description of Wales, tr. by sir R. C. Hoare.
- Powel, David (1584). The historie of Cambria, now called Wales: a part of the most famous Yland of Brytaine, written in the Brytish language aboue two hundreth yeares past. Translated by Llwyd, Humphrey. London: Rafe Newberrie and Henrie Denham. IA historieofcambri00cara.
- Williams, W. Llewelyn (1908). Giraldus Cambrensis, The Itinerary Through Wales and the Description of Wales.
- Lloyd, John Edward. "DAFYDD ab OWAIN GWYNEDD (died 1203), king of Gwynedd". Dictionary of Welsh Biography. National Library of Wales.

Regnal titles
Preceded by Hywel ab Owain Gwynedd	King of Gwynedd (disputed); 1170–1197	Succeeded by Gruffudd ap Cynan
