= Gruffudd ap Cynan ab Owain Gwynedd =

Gruffudd ap Cynan ab Owain Gwynedd was the grandson of Owain Gwynedd, a famous king of Gwynedd and ruler of most of Wales in the 12th century. The longer patronymic form of his name is usually used to distinguish him from the earlier and better-known Gruffudd ap Cynan, king of Gwynedd.

He was born c.1150 and died at Aberconwy Abbey in 1200. He is known to have fought alongside his brother Maredudd against his uncle Hywel in 1170 and later fought on the side of his cousin Llywelyn ab Iorwerth between 1194 and 1197 in a campaign to depose another uncle, Dafydd. Gruffudd is known to have had only one son, Hywel ap Gruffudd ap Cynan ab Owain Gwynedd, who is not known to have had any children of his own and died in 1216.
