= 1257 =

1257 in various calendars
- Gregorian calendar: 1257; MCCLVII
- Ab urbe condita: 2010
- Armenian calendar: 706; ԹՎ ՉԶ
- Assyrian calendar: 6007
- Balinese saka calendar: 1178–1179
- Bengali calendar: 663–664
- Berber calendar: 2207
- English Regnal year: 41 Hen. 3 – 42 Hen. 3
- Buddhist calendar: 1801
- Burmese calendar: 619
- Byzantine calendar: 6765–6766
- Chinese calendar: 丙辰年 (Fire Dragon); 3954 or 3747 — to — 丁巳年 (Fire Snake); 3955 or 3748
- Coptic calendar: 973–974
- Discordian calendar: 2423
- Ethiopian calendar: 1249–1250
- Hebrew calendar: 5017–5018
- Hindu calendars
- Vikram Samvat: 1313–1314
- Shaka Samvat: 1178–1179
- Kali Yuga: 4357–4358
- Holocene calendar: 11257
- Igbo calendar: 257–258
- Iranian calendar: 635–636
- Islamic calendar: 654–655
- Japanese calendar: Kōgen 2 / Shōka (era) 1 (正嘉元年)
- Javanese calendar: 1166–1167
- Julian calendar: 1257; MCCLVII
- Korean calendar: 3590
- Minguo calendar: 655 before ROC 民前655年
- Nanakshahi calendar: −211
- Thai solar calendar: 1799–1800
- Tibetan calendar: མེ་ཕོ་འབྲུག་ལོ་ (male Fire-Dragon); 1383 or 1002 or 230 — to — མེ་མོ་སྦྲུལ་ལོ་ (female Fire-Snake); 1384 or 1003 or 231

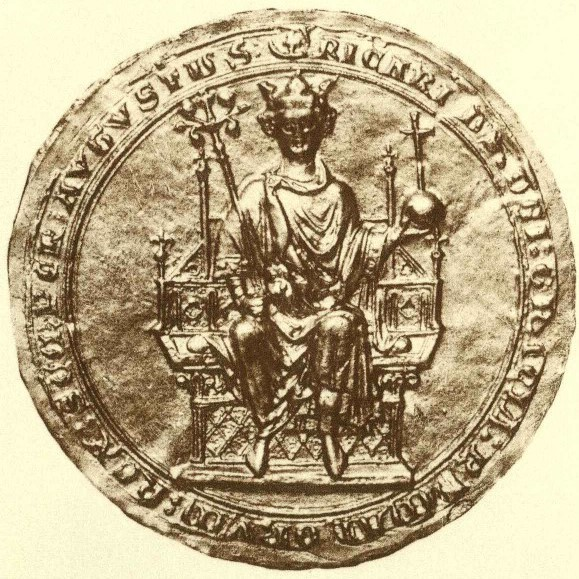
Seal of Richard of Cornwall

Year 1257 (MCCLVII) was a common year starting on Monday of the Julian calendar.

== Events ==
=== By place ===
==== Europe ====
- January 13 – At the first recorded meeting of the college of the seven Electors of the Holy Roman Empire, the 48-year-old Richard of Cornwall (the brother of King Henry III of England) is elected King of the Romans. He is crowned at Aachen, on May 17. His candidacy is opposed by King Alfonso X of Castile ("the Wise"), Pope Alexander IV and King Louis IX of France ("the Saint") who favour Alfonso, but both are ultimately convinced by Richard's sister-in-law, Queen Eleanor of Provence, to support Richard.
- Spring – The Epirote–Nicaean conflict (1257–59) begins between the Despotate of Epirus and the Empire of Nicaea. Despot Michael II Komnenos Doukas revolts and defeats the Nicaean army under George Akropolites. The Epirote and Serbian forces join their attacks against Michael, who sends his forces into Macedonia and marches on to Thessalonica. In response, Michael is attacked – on the west coast of Epirus – by Manfred of Sicily. Manfred first occupies the major Ionian Islands, including Corfu. Then he lands on the Albanian coast and takes Durazzo, Berat, Valona and their environs.
- The pagan Karelians start a destructive expedition to Sweden in which King Valdemar requests Alexander IV to declare a crusade against them. This leads to the Third Swedish Crusade to Finland (1293–95).

==== British Isles ====
- Battle of Cadfan: An English expeditionary army under Stephen Bauzan is ambushed and defeated by Welsh forces. The English are decimated by devastating guerilla attacks and the Welsh capture the English supply train. Stephen Bauzan is killed along with some 1,000–3,000 of his men. The remaining English flee the battle, Prince Llywelyn ap Gruffudd is said to have been present at the battle, collecting spoils from the fallen English army. According to sources, it is one of the greatest victories of a Welsh army in the field against a much more powerful English force.
- King Henry III of England relents to the demands of his son The Lord Edward for assistance to fight the Welsh, originally made in 1256). He joins him on a campaign to retake the territories lost to the Welsh forces led by Llywelyn ap Gruffudd.
- Henry III of England orders the production of a pure gold penny coin with a value of twenty pence. Unfortunately, the bullion value of the coins is about 20% higher than the nominal face value, leading to poor circulation, as coins are melted down by individuals for their gold content.
- Battle of Creadran Cille: Norman invading forces under Maurice FitzGerald are driven out by Gofraid O'Donnell in northern Connacht (Ireland). On May 20, FitzGerald is killed in personal combat by O'Donnell.

==== Egypt ====
- Egyptian judge Ibn bint al-A'azz appointed Vizier of Egypt for a second term.

==== Levant ====
- Venetian–Genoese Wars: The Venetian fleet under Admiral Lorenzo Tiepolo breaks through the harbour chain at Acre and destroys several Genoese ships. He also attacks the fortifications but Tiepolo is unable to expel the Genoese garrison (some 800 men strong and armed with 50–60 ballistae), from their quarter of the city throwing up a blockade.
- April 10 – Izz al-Din Aybak, Mamluk sultan of Egypt, is murdered on orders of his wife, Shajar al-Durr. He is succeeded by his 14-year-old son, Nur al-Din Ali, as ruler of the Mamluk Sultanate (until 1259).

==== Mongol Empire ====
- Spring – Mongol forces under Uriyangkhadai conduct a campaign against local Yi and Lolo tribes in Vietnam. He returns to Gansu and sends messengers to the court of Möngke Khan informing him that Yunnan is firmly under Mongolian control. Möngke Khan honors and rewards Uriyangkhadai for his military achievements.
- Winter – Mongol forces move down from their base at Hamadan, while Baiju Noyan crosses the river Tigris at Mosul with his army. On the left-wing Kitbuqa enters the plain of Iraq, while Mongol forces under Hulagu Khan advance through Kermanshah.

==== Asia ====
- March – The Japanese Kōgen era ends and the Shōka begins during the reign of the 14-year-old Emperor Go-Fukakusa (until 1259).

=== By topic ===
==== City and Towns ====
- June 5 – The city of Kraków is granted Magdeburg rights by High Duke Bolesław V the Chaste, having been rebuilt after being nearly destroyed during the First Mongol invasion of Poland (but Second invasion comes in 1259).

==== Education ====
- Louis IX of France ("the Saint") confirms the foundation by his chaplain Robert de Sorbon of the College of Sorbonne in Paris, giving a formal college (and still-common name) to the already existing University of Paris.

==== Literature ====
- Matthew Paris, English monk and chronicler, personally interviews Henry III for an entire week while compiling his major work of English history, Chronica Majora.

==== Natural Disaster ====
- Samalas eruption: Mount Samalas volcano erupts on Lombok Island, Indonesia. One of the largest volcanic eruptions in the past 10,000 years, it creates severe climatic changes across the globe, leading to severe famine and death, and to one of the biggest geopolitical changes across the globe over the next few centuries.

== Births ==
- March 24 – Yolanda of Lusignan, French noblewoman (d. 1314)
- c. June 24 – Robert de Vere, 6th Earl of Oxford, English nobleman and knight (d. 1331)
- August 15 – Muhammad III, ruler of Granada (d. 1314)
- October 14 – Przemysł II, king of Poland (d. 1296)
- Agnes of Brandenburg, queen consort of Denmark (d. 1304)
- Beatrice of Burgundy, Lady of Bourbon, French noblewoman (d. 1310)
- Frederick I, Margrave of Meissen ("the Brave"), German nobleman (d. 1323)
- Malise III, Earl of Strathearn, Scottish nobleman (d. 1312)
- Parsoma ("the Naked"), Egyptian Coptic hermit (d. 1317)
- Philip III of Falkenstein, count of Münzenberg (d. 1322)
- William Russell, English nobleman and knight (d. 1311)

== Deaths ==
- April 10 – Aybak, ruler of the Mamluk Sultanate
- April 26 – Euphemia de Walliers, English nun and abbess
- May 3 – Katherine of England, English princess (b. 1253)
- May 5 – Haakon the Young, junior king of Norway (b. 1232)
- May 17 – Ch'oe Hang, Korean general and dictator (b. 1209)
- May 20 – Maurice FitzGerald, 2nd Lord of Offaly, Norman Irish nobleman and knight, killed in combat
- c. May 20 – Roger Weseham, English bishop of Coventry and Lichfield
- June 4 – Przemysł I, Polish nobleman and co-ruler (b. 1221)
- June 8 – Simon of Elmham, English prior and bishop-elect
- July 29 – Matilda I (or Mathilde de Courtenay), countess in her own right of Nevers, Auxerre and Tonnerre (b. 1188)
- August 15 – Hyacinth of Poland, Polish missionary (b. 1185)
- December 24 – John of Avesnes, count of Hainaut (b. 1218)
- December 26 – Richard Blund (or Blundy), English bishop
- Lanfranc Cigala (or Cicala), Genoese nobleman and knight
- Maria of Antioch-Armenia, Outremer noblewoman (b. 1215)
- Mohammad Baba As-Samasi, Abbasid Sufi leader (b. 1195) (tradition places his death at 1354)
- Sartaq Khan (or Sartak), Mongol ruler of the Golden Horde, probably poisoned
- Stephen Bauzan, English nobleman, seneschal and knight, killed in battle
- Valdemar III, Duke of Schleswig (Abelsøn), Danish prince and heir apparent
- William of Cassingham ("Willikin of the Weald"), English warrior and guerrilla leader
- Yuan Haowen, Chinese politician, poet and writer (b. 1190)
