= Domen Fawr, Tafolwern =

Castle in Wales

Coordinates: 52.61014°N 3.63919°W

Domen Fawr, or Tafolwern Castle was a motte-and-bailey castle of the Middle Ages. It is situated in Tafolwern, near Llanbrynmair in Powys. It is registered with Cadw as monument MG065 and is a scheduled monument.

The motte is 6 metres high and 40 metres wide at the base. It lies between two small rivers - Afon Twymyn and Afon Rhiw Saeson, which may have been dammed to form a moat. It was likely built by Owain Cyfeiliog around 1149. It was captured by Hywel ap Ieuaf in 1162, then recaptured by Owain. The last reference to the site is in 1244, when Gruffydd ap Gwenwynwyn was trapped there by a Welsh army.
