= Maredudd ap Rhys Gryg =

Welsh prince, of Deheubarth

Maredudd ap Rhys Grug (died 1271), was the son of Rhys Gryg (a Welsh prince of Deheubarth) and Mathilde de Clare (a daughter of Richard de Clare, 3rd Earl of Hertford, Marcher Lord of Cardigan). Maredudd initially ruled north east of Ystrad Tywi, including Llandovery Castle, until he expanded to rule the region encompassing Dryslwyn castle.

When his father died, in 1234, Maredudd was still young, and his wardship was entrusted to Gilbert Marshal, 4th Earl of Pembroke; their mothers were distant cousins. In 1241, Maredudd married Gilbert's niece, Isobella; the marriage had probably been arranged earlier.

Maredudd ap Rhys Gryg died at Dryslwyn on 27 July 1271, leaving behind his son, Rhys ap Maredudd. He is buried at Whitland Abbey.

== Exile ==
Maredudd was exiled from the south around 1250 due to rivalries with his brother and his nephew, Rhys Mechyll and Rhys Fychan ap Rhys Mechyll. He fled to Gwynedd where he joined Llywelyn ap Gruffydd on his successful campaigns of 1256. Llywelyn thus rewarded him with land round Llanbadarn and Cantref Buellt.

== Treason and homage ==
Maredudd contributed significantly in the 1257 battle of Cymerau where the Welsh side were victorious. However, Rhys Fychan's siding with the Welsh during this battle disenfranchised Maredudd; though he swore allegiance to Llywelyn in 1258, he later that year sided with the king.

Consequently, on 28 May 1259, Maredydd was put on trial for treason. He was found guilty by a council of native lords and imprisoned in the castle at Criccieth.

In 1261, Maredudd was granted reconciliation with Llywelyn under severe terms, though the king retained Maredudd's homage in 1267 following the peace of Montgomery. Llywelyn received this homage in 1270.
