= Stephen Bauzan =

English knight

Sir Stephen Bauzan (born after 1210 – died 1257) was an English knight. Stephen descended from a prominent family originating in Devon/Cornwall.

== Move to Wales ==
Bauzan first came to South Wales in the service of Gilbert Marshal, 4th Earl of Pembroke. In 1243, Richard de Clare, 6th Earl of Hertford (recently appointed feudal lord of Glamorgan, and the Earl of Clare) made Bauzan Sheriff of the County. This was possibly a plot to reduce the influence of the noble Richard Siward, Lord of Talyfan and Llanbleddian (who had been appointed 'keeper' of Glamorgan by Gilbert de Clare, 5th Earl of Hertford- Richard's father). Richard charged Siward with treason for breaking a truce.

In order to settle the matter, Bauzan challenged Siward to a Trial by Combat. Siward refused. After refusing the Trial, Siward was declared an outlaw by Richard, and all of his lands were confiscated. Richard granted to Bauzan the lands of Breigan and Llansannor, which he had recently stripped from Siward.

== Conflict with the Welsh and the battle of Cadfan ==
Following his recent land gains, Bauzan began to align himself with the king's son, Prince Edward. Stephen was made Seneschal of Gascony in 1255 having fallen further into royal favour. Edward had recently been appointed Earl of Chester, and was starting to put pressure on the Welsh prince Llywelyn ap Gruffudd. Llywelyn responded to the English threat by stripping the English supporter Rhys Fychan of his lands in Southwestern Wales. Stephen Bauzan was sent with a large army to restore Rhys Fychan. However the land taken from Rhys had been given to Rhys's uncles Maredudd ap Rhys and Maredudd ap Owain, and they were not ready to submit to Stephen's army. When Stephen's army invaded Wales, they were greeted by a strong Welsh force and defeated at the Battle of Cadfan in 1257. Bauzan was killed during the battle.
