= Battle of Cadfan =

1257 battle

Coordinates: 51.886957°N 4.065431°W

Date	1257
Location	Coed Llathen and Cymerau (areas thought to be in present day Broad Oak around the Cadfan farmhouse in the Towy Valley)
Result	Welsh victory

Belligerents
Principality of Wales	Kingdom of England

Commanders and leaders
Maredudd ap Rhys Gryg; Maredudd ap Owain	Stephen Bauzan †; Nicholas Martin

Strength
Several Thousand	Several Thousand

Casualties and losses
Light	Up to 3,000

The Battle of Cadfan was fought between English and Welsh forces in 1257. The battle consisted of two military engagements; one at Coed Llathen and the other at Cymerau. The word Cadfan is Welsh for "place of battle".

== Background ==
In the years before the battle, Llywelyn ap Gruffudd of Gwynedd had been rapidly gaining power. Llywelyn had received much support from the lords of Deheubarth, Maredudd ap Rhys and Maredudd ap Owain, during the campaign, and as a reward for their loyalty, he gave them land that he had stripped from their nephew, Rhys Fychan (who was a supporter of the English king). Prince Edward (recently appointed Earl of Chester) had noticed Llywelyn's growing power and raised an army in an attempt to counter the potential threat of Llywelyn. Edward had support from several English nobles, however he had little aid from his father, Henry III of England.

The forces of Edward (led by the English nobles Stephen Bauzan, Lord of Breigan and Llansannor and Nicholas FitzMartin, Lord of Cemais) invaded Wales with a large army of English, Gascon, and south Welsh troops in an attempt to restore Rhys and to halt Llywelyn's growing power.

== English preparations and advance ==
The English army was transported by sea and landed near Carmarthen. On Tuesday 29 May 1257, the English army was assembled. The army was made up mainly of soldiers from England, but their ranks were bolstered by local English and Gascon colonists as well as some Welsh soldiers and mercenaries. The following Thursday, the English army marched towards Llandeilo through the Towy valley suppressing Welsh opposition and pillaging and destroying Welsh settlements. The English plan was to force the nearby fortress, Dinefwr Castle, to surrender through intimidation.

== Battle ==
=== First day ===
On Friday night, the English army encamped in the vicinity of Llandeilo Fawr. Maredudd ap Rhys and Maredudd ap Owain had armies hidden in the woods which had followed the English army. The Welsh army harassed the encamped English constantly with a combination of arrows, spears, and intimidating sounds. The English suffered some casualties, and since morale was low, Stephen Bauzan quickly sent Rhys Fychan (who had guided the army) to negotiate with Dinefwr castle's garrison. However, Rhys is said to have either been seized by the garrison or to have betrayed the English. Either way, the English army had now lost its guide.

=== Second day ===
==== Battle of Coed Llathen ====
Lacking a guide, the English army decided to march back to Carmarthen. The Welsh armies in the woods hit the English with devastating guerrilla attacks (using mostly bows or javelins) from the first hour of Saturday right up until midday. There was an engagement between the two forces at midday which saw the Welsh troops outflank the English and successfully capture the English supply train at Coed Llathen. Although there seem to have been few casualties, the engagement at Coed Llathen swung the balance in favour of the Welsh since the English had lost most of their provisions.

==== Battle of Cymerau ====
Following their defeat at Coed Llathen, the English army retreated westward towards Cymerau. The land at Cymerau was ideal for the Welsh since it contained ravines and heavily wooded areas which would allow the Welsh to ambush the English with ease. The land was also wet and marshy, meaning that the English knights would have trouble riding over it.

The Welsh ambushed the English with their full army and a bloody battle ensued. Many English were said to have been torn from their mounts and trampled to death by the Welsh army. Stephen Bauzan was killed along with around 1,000–3,000 of his men (the number killed varies with the source). The remaining Englishmen fled the battle.

Llywelyn ap Gruffudd, Prince of Gwynedd, is said to have been present at the battle, collecting spoils from the fallen English army.

== Aftermath, later conflicts, and the Treaty of Montgomery ==
The victory at Cadfan allowed the Welsh forces to take the castles of Laugharne, Llansteffan, and Narberth. Rhys Fychan hastily made his peace with Llywelyn, and Llywelyn returned Rhys's lands to him. There was a problem, however: Maredudd ap Rhys and Maredudd ap Owain had now been stripped of their new land. The two therefore switched sides and paid homage to Henry later that year. King Henry (who had originally viewed Llywelyn's rising as only a small rebellion) was shocked. Henry quickly realized the seriousness of the situation and personally organized another attack on Wales during the same year. This attack also proved unsuccessful when supply ships from Ireland failed to reach Henry and Edward's invading army. Lacking food and supplies, the English army was forced to retreat, being constantly harassed by victorious Welsh guerrilla fighters on the way back. Edward launched yet another invasion of Wales in 1262 following Llywelyn's raids in the Welsh Marches. Edward, however, was forced to pull his armies out of Wales due to internal conflicts in England. Llywelyn retaliated by campaigning against the English Marcher Lords in a devastating campaign which led King Henry (who had been considerably weakened by the Second Barons' War) to open negotiations with Llywelyn at the Treaty of Montgomery which won Llywelyn much land at the expense of the defeated Marcher Lords.
