= Carlton (surname) =

Carlton is a surname, and may refer to:

== People ==
- Albert E. Carlton (1866–1931), American investor
- Alfred Carlton (1867–1941), Australian cricketer
- Andrew Carlton, American singer, songwriter and music producer
- Ann Marie Carlton, American chemist
- Bart Carlton (1908–1993), American basketball player
- Bill Carlton (1894–1949), Australian politician
- Bob Carlton (1950–2018), English theatre director and writer
- Brian Carlton (born 1962), Australian radio announcer, producer and journalist
- Bronwyn Carlton (born 1962), American comic-book writer and radio DJ
- Carl Carlton (1953–2025), American singer and songwriter
- Carl Carlton (German musician) (born 1955), German rock guitarist, composer and producer
- Carrie Carlton (c.1834–1868), American poet, writer and journalist
- Cesilie Carlton (born 1981), American high diver
- Clark Thomas Carlton, American novelist, playwright and screenwriter
- Danny Carlton (born 1983), English footballer
- Darryl Carlton (1953–1994), American football player
- Dave Carlton (born 1952), English footballer
- Doyle E. Carlton (1885–1972), American lawyer and politician
- Doyle E. Carlton Jr. (1922–2003), American politician
- Drew Carlton (born 1995), American baseball player
- Eva Carlton (born 2004), American actress
- Fran Carlton (born 1936), American politician
- Frank Carlton (rugby league) (1936–2009), English rugby league footballer
- Frank Carlton (politician) (1935–2009), American lawyer and politician
- Gaither Carlton (1901–1972), American fiddle and banjo player
- Guy Carlton (1954–2001), American weightlifter
- Harold Carlton, British writer
- Henry H. Carlton (1835–1905), American politician, physician, journalist and soldier
- James Carlton (actor) (born 1977), English actor
- James Carlton (athlete) (1909–1951), Australian sprinter
- Jane M. Carlton, British biologist
- Jemma Carlton, English actress
- J. Phil Carlton (born 1938), American judge
- Jim Carlton (1935–2015), Australian politician
- John Carlton (1866–1945), Australian cricketer
- Josh Carlton (born 1999), American basketball player
- Larry Carlton (born 1948), American studio guitarist
- Lawrence K. Karlton, American judge
- Lisa Carlton, American politician from Florida
- Mabry A. Carlton (1903–1959), American politician
- Maggie Carlton (born 1957), American politician
- Maurice Carlton (1913–1990), French athlete
- Melissa Carlton (born 1978), Australian swimmer
- Mike Carlton (born 1946), Australian radio host, journalist and author
- Neely C. Carlton (born 1970), American attorney and politician
- Newcomb Carlton (1869–1953), American telecommunications executive
- Paul K. Carlton (1921–2009), United States Air Force general
- Paul K. Carlton Jr. (born 1947), United States Air Force lieutenant general
- Phil Carlton (footballer) (born 1953), Australian rules footballer
- Richard Carlton (c.1558–c.1638), English cleric and composer
- Rob Carlton (born 1971), Australian actor and writer
- Rudy Carlton (born c.1984), American football coach
- Steve Carlton (born 1944), professional baseball player (1965–88)
- Thad H. Carlton (1906–1965), American politician
- Timothy Carlton (born 1939), English actor
- Tom Carlton (1890–1973), Australian cricketer
- Trevor Carlton (born 1972), American painter
- Vanessa Carlton (born 1980), pop and rock singer, songwriter and pianist
- Vassar B. Carlton (1912–2005), American judge
- William Carlton (cricketer) (1876–1959), Australian cricketer
- Winslow Carlton (1907–1994), American businessman and organizer of cooperatives
- Wray Carlton (born 1937), American football player

== Fictional characters ==
- Johnny Cage, born Jonathan "John" Carlton, from the Mortal Kombat video game series

== See also ==
- Justice Carlton (disambiguation)
- Senator Carlton (disambiguation)
- Carleton (surname)
