= Paul Carlton =

Paul Carlton may refer to:

- Paul K. Carlton (1921–2009), commander in chief of the Military Airlift Command
- Paul K. Carlton Jr. (born 1946), Surgeon General of the United States Air Force
