= Phil Carlton =

Phil Carlton may refer to:

- J. Phil Carlton (born 1938), North Carolina judge
- Phil Carlton (footballer) (born 1953), Australian rules footballer
