= Criccieth Castle =

13th-century castle in Gwynedd, Wales

- Castell Cricieth (Welsh) (Note: Since 2024, Cadw, who maintain the site, use the Welsh name only.)
- Criccieth, Gwynedd, Wales
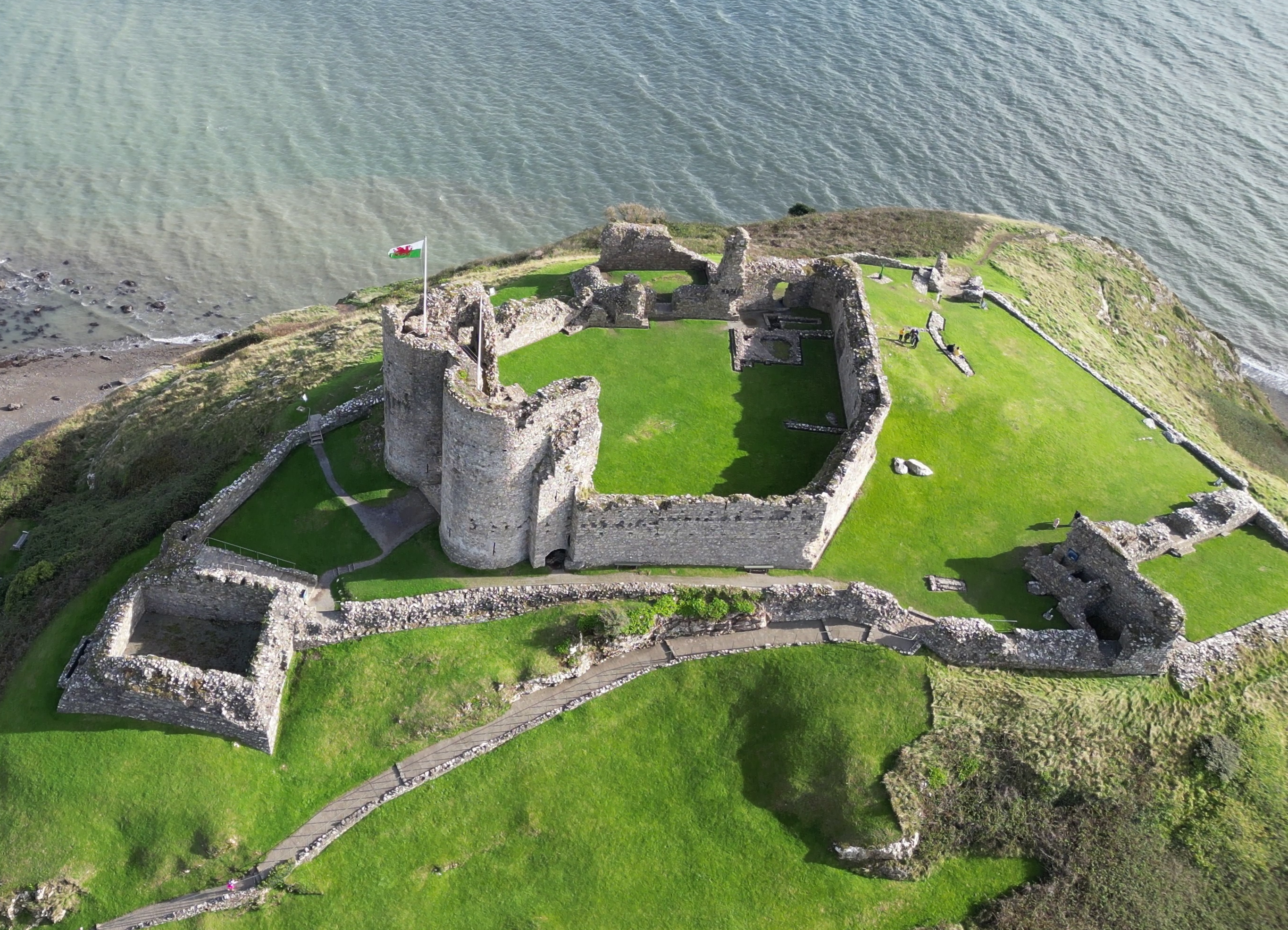
- The castle from the north-west

Site information
- Owner: Cadw
- Open to the public: yes
- Condition: ruinous
- Website: Castell Cricieth (Cadw)

Location
- Location in Wales
- Location within Wales
- Coordinates: 52.916°N 4.2325°W

Site history
- Built: phase one: c. 1230 phase two between 1255 and 1282 phase three: 1283–1292, 1307–1327
- Built by: phase one: Llywelyn ab Iorwerth phase two: Llywelyn ap Gruffudd phase three: Edward I and Edward II
- Battles/wars: Conquest of Wales by Edward I; Rebellion of Madog ap Llywelyn; Rebellion of Owain Glyndŵr

Garrison information
- Past commanders: Sir William Leyburn (constable fl. 1284); Syr Hywel y Fwyall (c. 1359 – c. 1381)
- Garrison: 60, including 10 crossbowmen, in 1283–84

Listed Building – Grade I
- Official name: Criccieth Castle
- Designated: 2 August 1949
- Reference no.: 4396

Scheduled monument
- Official name: Castell Cricieth
- Reference no.: CN015

Scheduled monument
- Official name: Criccieth Castle, Outer Bank Defences
- Reference no.: CN173

Criccieth Castle (Welsh: Castell Cricieth; Welsh pronunciation: [kastɛɬ ˈkrɪkjɛθ]) is a ruined thirteenth-century castle in Criccieth, Gwynedd, Wales. It is located on a rocky headland overlooking Tremadog Bay and consists of an inner ward almost surrounded by an outer ward. The twin-towered inner gatehouse is the most prominent remaining feature and survives to almost its full height, as does the inner curtain wall. The outer curtain wall, the inner ward buildings, and the castle's other three towers are significantly more ruinous, and in places survive only as foundations.

The castle was begun in the 1230s by Llywelyn ap Iorwerth, the prince of Gwynedd, who probably built the inner ward and gatehouse. It was extended by his grandson, Llywelyn ap Gruffudd, who probably constructed the outer ward. The castle was captured by Edward I of England in 1283 during his conquest of Wales and afterwards repaired and improved, work which included heightening the towers and inner gatehouse. The castle was besieged in 1294–1295 during an unsuccessful revolt against English rule by Madog ap Llywelyn, and further repairs took place under Edward II in the early fourteenth century. It was captured in 1404 during another unsuccessful revolt, led by Owain Glyndŵr. It may have been burnt after the latter attack and was certainly ruinous by the 1450s. Until it was destroyed the castle was frequently used as a prison, housing high-status prisoners of the princes of Gwynedd and Scottish prisoners of Edward I.

The castle was subsequently left to decay, and was considered a romantic ruin by the time it was sketched by J. M. W. Turner in 1798. It was sold by the Crown in 1858 but returned to state care in 1933, after which extensive consolidation and archaeological excavations took place. The castle is now maintained by Cadw, the historic environment service of the Welsh Government, and is open to the public. It was designated a grade I listed building in 1949, and both the castle proper and its outer defences are scheduled monuments.

== Early history ==
The only other castle site near Criccieth is a motte at Dolbenmaen, approximately 4 miles (6.4 km) north of the town, which may have been built by the Normans in the eleventh century but was soon occupied by the Welsh. Dolbenmaen was probably the administrative centre (maerdref) of the commote of Eifionydd, and the motte is associated with the court (llys) of the commote's rulers. Eifionydd's administrative centre was transferred to Criccieth in the 1230s, when Llywelyn ap Iorwerth built the current castle; prior to this the only structures in Criccieth were the parish church of St Catherine and its associated buildings.

It is probable that the inner ward of the current castle was built by Llywelyn ap Iorwerth in the 1230s and the outer ward between 1255 and 1282 during the rule of his grandson, Llywelyn ap Gruffudd. In 1239 Dafydd ap Llywelyn, the son and heir of Llywelyn ap Iorwerth, imprisoned Gruffudd ap Llywelyn ap Iorwerth and Owain Goch ap Gruffydd, his half-brother and half-nephew, at Criccieth. It is probable that the castle was used to house them. Gruffudd ap Llywelyn ap Iorwerth is also described as "Pendefic crukyeith", or 'Lord of Criccieth' in a contemporary eulogistic awdl poem by Einion ap Madog ap Rhahawd. The castle is again recorded as a prison in 1259, when it housed Maredudd ap Rhys Gryg, a prince of Deheubarth who rebelled against Llywelyn ap Gruffudd. One of the last Welsh records of the castle is a letter from Llywelyn ap Gruffudd to Edward I, sent from Criccieth in 1273 or 1274.

By March 1283 the castle had been captured by the English as part of Edward I's conquest of Wales, and the king visited in that year and in 1284. Between 1283 and 1292 the Pipe rolls record that £332 was spent at the castle, and the final expenditure for this period may have been closer to £500. This mostly consisted of improvements to existing structures, particularly the towers, which were heightened and had ground-floor doors inserted. External stairs were also constructed to give access to their first floors and the wall-walks. These changes brought the castle up to date militarily by making each floor of the towers a self-contained defensive unit. A borough was established next to the castle in November 1284; it had 23 burgage plots, the same number as Caernarfon, but does not appear to have been walled.

In 1283–1284, when the Welsh castles were particularly well-manned, the Criccieth garrison contained 30 homines defensabiles (garrison men), 10 baslistarii (crossbowmen), 15 residui (residents, including sentinels, a doorkeeper, and caretaker), 1 attilliator (superintendent of arms), 1 capellanus (chaplain), 1 cementarius (stonemason), 1 carpentarius (carpenter), and 1 faber (artisan). Sir William Leyburn was the constable and paid £100 yearly. (Note: This is identical to the garrison recorded at Harlech in the same period but slightly smaller than that at Conwy, which had 15 crossbowmen and whose constable was paid £190. Castell y Bere and Caernarfon had larger garrisons again, with 15 crossbowmen, 40 garrison men, and 20 residents, but their constables were paid £130.)

In 1294 Criccieth was besieged as part of a revolt against English rule by Madog ap Llywelyn. The revolt took Caernarfon Castle and sacked the town, and the castles at Harlech and Aberystwyth were also sieged. The garrison at the time consisted of Sir William Leyburn, who was still the constable, 29 men, and 41 townsfolk who had taken refuge in the castle. The siege was lifted in April 1295 and the castle resupplied by sea from Ireland. After this the castle was again used as a prison; further repairs took place between 1307 and 1327 under Edward II, which included raising the gatehouse a second time. Nevertheless, when Edward the Black Prince commissioned a survey of the castle in 1343 it was again dilapidated and in need of repairs which would cost £96 in total. The same document names the castle towers as the great tower, "sister (cistern) tour", Leyburn tower, and "le gynnetour". The English archaeologist Bryan O'Neil identifies these as the inner gatehouse, south-west tower (which contained a cistern), south-east tower, and north tower respectively. From c. 1359 to 1381 the castle constable was Syr Hywel y Fwyall ('of the Battleaxe'), who may have commanded a corps of Welshmen at the Battle of Crécy and certainly fought for Edward III at the Battle of Poitiers in 1356.

== Later history ==
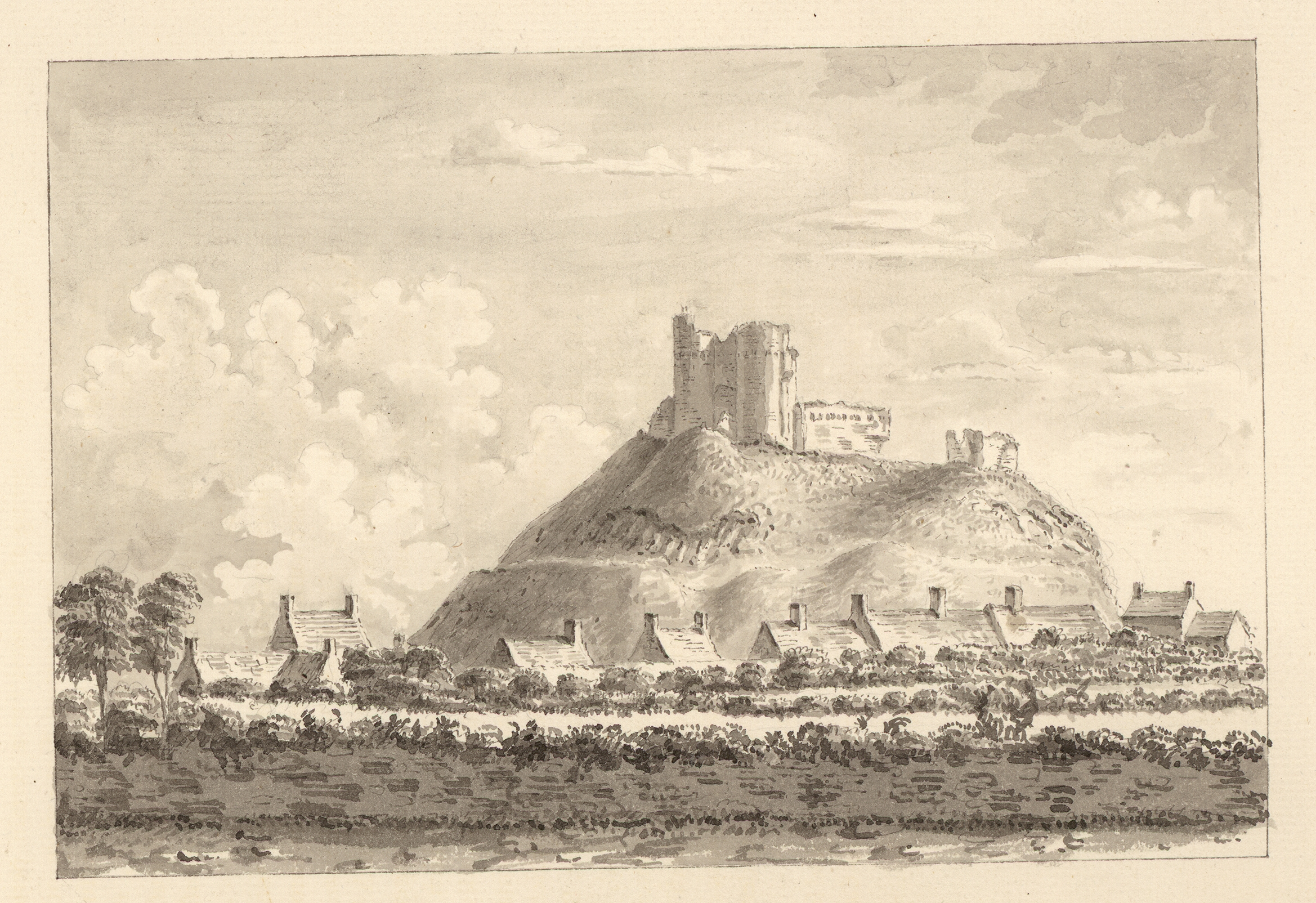
An image of "Criciaeth Castle" from the 1781 edition of Thomas Pennant's A Tour in Wales, which chronicles the three journeys he made through Wales between 1773 and 1776.

The castle's downfall came in the first half of the fifteenth century, when it was destroyed by fire. The walls of the inner gatehouse, south-west tower, and south-east tower are burnt red, and a layer of burnt material has been found during excavations in each. It is probable that the fire occurred in 1404, when the castle was captured during the rebellion of Owain Glyndŵr and, according to a document of 1450, "totally destroyed". Nevertheless, that same document enlarged the castle's garrison and does not mention repairs to the structure, so it is possible that the revolt did not cause total ruin. If this is the case then the fires took place not long after 1450, as there are no further references to the castle being used as a fortress and no record of constables being appointed after Glyndŵr's sacking. The adjacent borough also suffered; it was described as "clene decayed" by John Leland, who travelled through Wales between 1535 and 1545, and by Thomas Pennant in c. 1784 as a "poor borough town".

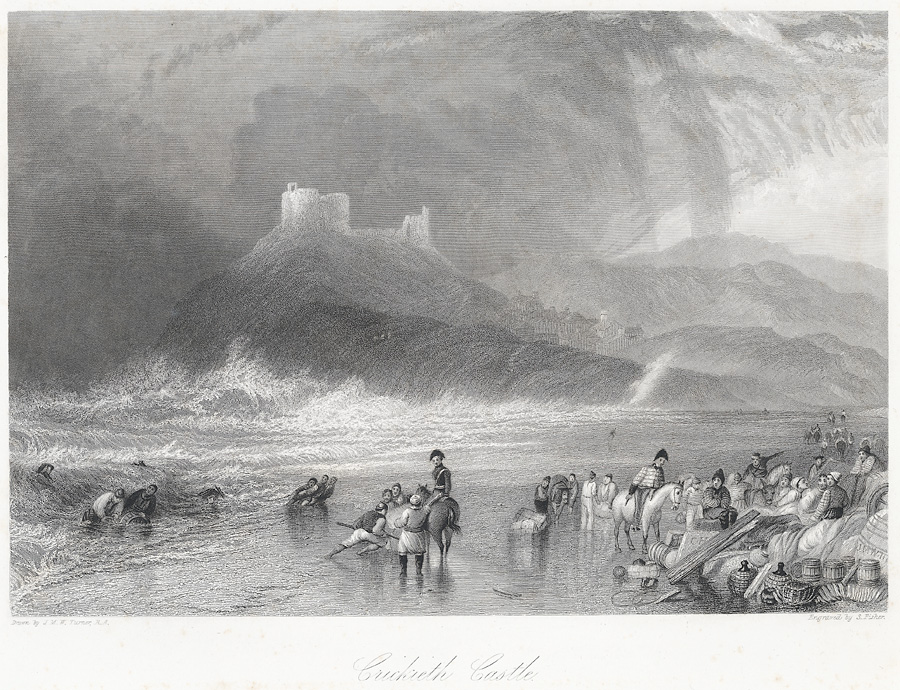
An engraving of "Crickieth Castle" made from Turner's watercolour.

Criccieth is the subject of four colour studies by the Romantic artist J. M. W. Turner, as well as one full watercolour depicting salvage on Criccieth beach with the castle in the background. The sketches were undertaken when Turner visited the coast of North Wales in 1798, and the watercolour dates from 1835. Turner took some artistic licence with the latter, depicting the cliffs higher than in reality and depicting the sea in an unlikely position according to the usual pattern of Criccieth's tides.

It is possible that some restoration work took place under the Crown before the sale of the castle in 1858 to William Ormsby-Gore, 2nd Baron Harlech, and Lord Harlech certainly undertook some restoration work in 1879. More work took place in 1933 before George Ormsby-Gore, 3rd Baron Harlech, placed the castle under the guardianship of the Office of Works. The state carried out extensive consolidation of the fabric, and the castle was excavated under the supervision of Bryan O'Neil; prior to these excavations much of the outer ward and part of the south-east tower were buried. Some parts of the site may have been covered deliberately, as the north tower contained "modern" bricks and china and there was a local tradition that it was infilled in the nineteenth century to prevent children playing in the remains. The castle is now maintained by Cadw, the historic environment service of the Welsh Government, and includes exhibits and information on Welsh castles as well as the 12th-century Anglo-Norman writer Gerald of Wales. It typically receives between 42,000 and 48,000 visitors per year; this number dropped during the COVID-19 pandemic, and 31,527 people visited in 2021. (Note: Visitor numbers for recent years were 4,709 in 2020; 46,083 in 2019; 47,411 in 2018; 42,863 in 2017; 47,935 in 2016; 45,715 in 2015; and 43,578 in 2014.)

Since 2024, Cadw have used the Welsh name "Castell Cricieth" in English.

== Building sequence ==
The building sequence of the castle is the subject of debate and relies heavily on analysis of the surviving fabric; the Welsh building work is poorly documented, and although English accounts of expenditure on the castle survive they do not record what the sums were spent on.

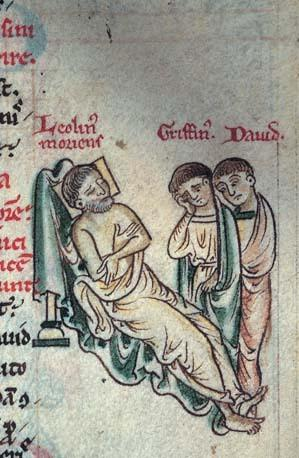
Llywelyn ab Iorwerth (left), who began building the castle, with his sons Gruffudd (centre) and Dafydd (right)

An early attempt to date the castle by observing its fabric was made by the antiquarian Thomas Pennant in his 1784 Tour in Wales. Despite Edward I being the "supposed founder" of the castle, Pennant would "entertain no doubt" that Criccieth was built by a native Welsh prince because of the similarity of the inner gatehouse to Dolwyddelan Castle. He did, however, incorrectly believe that the rounded outer faces of the gatehouse towers were an Edwardian addition. A more thorough survey of the castle by Harold Hughes, published in Archaeologia Cambrensis in 1905, gives some idea of the state of the castle before it was excavated later that century. The above-ground fabric was obscured by ivy, modern restoration, and a cairn, and much of the outer ward and the south-east tower were buried. This made it difficult to ascertain the date and original plan of the castle, particularly that of the outer ward – for example, Hughes speculates that what is now identified as the south-east tower may have been a gateway.

When Criccieth was placed in state care in 1933 extensive archaeological excavations were begun, under the direction of Bryan O'Neil, and continued until shortly after the outbreak of World War II. During this time the buried portions of the castle were uncovered and many objects were recovered; a significant find was a crucifix made of gilt bronze and Limoges enamel, found in the western inner gatehouse tower and now in the collection of Amgueddfa Cymru. O'Neil concluded from these discoveries that there were three primary building phases: the first dated to the early thirteenth century and included most of the inner ward, the second was dated to c. 1260 and included most of the outer ward, and the third consisted of later additions to the first two phases undertaken by Edward I and Edward II after the English capture of the castle. O'Neil's identification of three building phases is widely accepted, and together with the excavations forms the basis of the contemporary understanding of the castle. The academic debate has since shifted to identifying which parts of the fabric belong to which phase. In his 1970 guide to the castle, C. N. Johns suggested that the outer ward predated the inner ward; however, this theory was not supported by later historians and Richard Avent reverted to O'Neil's building sequence in his 1989 guide. For his part, in 1983 Avent thought it likely that the north tower was English work, but by 1989 considered Llywelyn ab Iorwerth to be the more probable builder.

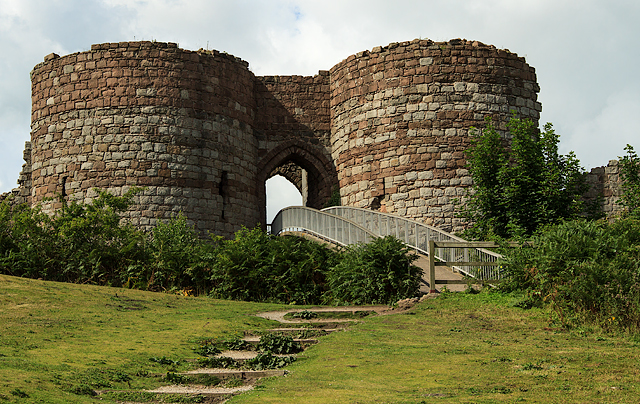
The inner gatehouse of Beeston Castle, Cheshire.

The source for the design of the inner gatehouse has been another topic of debate. There is consensus that Beeston Castle in Cheshire was the primary source, a theory supported by archaeologists including Richard Avent, Laurence Keen, and Rachel Swallow. Beeston was built in the 1220s by Ranulf de Blondeville, an ally of Llywelyn ap Iorwerth, (Note: De Blondeville's nephew and later heir, John of Scotland, married Llywelyn's daughter Elen ferch Llywelyn in 1222.) and is broadly similar to Criccieth. It was built on a crag and its inner gatehouse consists of two D-shaped towers, each containing a chamber with two arrowloops facing the approach, and a gate passage guarded by a portcullis and a pair of doors. There are differences: Criccieth has three arrowloops to each guardroom, had a stone–vaulted gate passage rather than a wooden ceiling, and its towers were longer and similar to apsidal keeps. Similarities have also been noted between the Criccieth gatehouse and that at Bolingbroke Castle in Lincolnshire, also built by Ranulf de Blondeville; with Montgomery Castle in Powys, which was attacked by Llywelyn ap Iorwerth in 1228 and 1231; and with White Castle in Monmouthshire. The second and third castles were associated with Hubert de Burgh, a marcher lord and major power in South Wales. Whatever the exact inspiration for the gatehouse, the result, according to Avent, is that at Criccieth "the latest advances in military technology" are combined with the "somewhat haphazard Welsh castle building style".

== Architecture ==
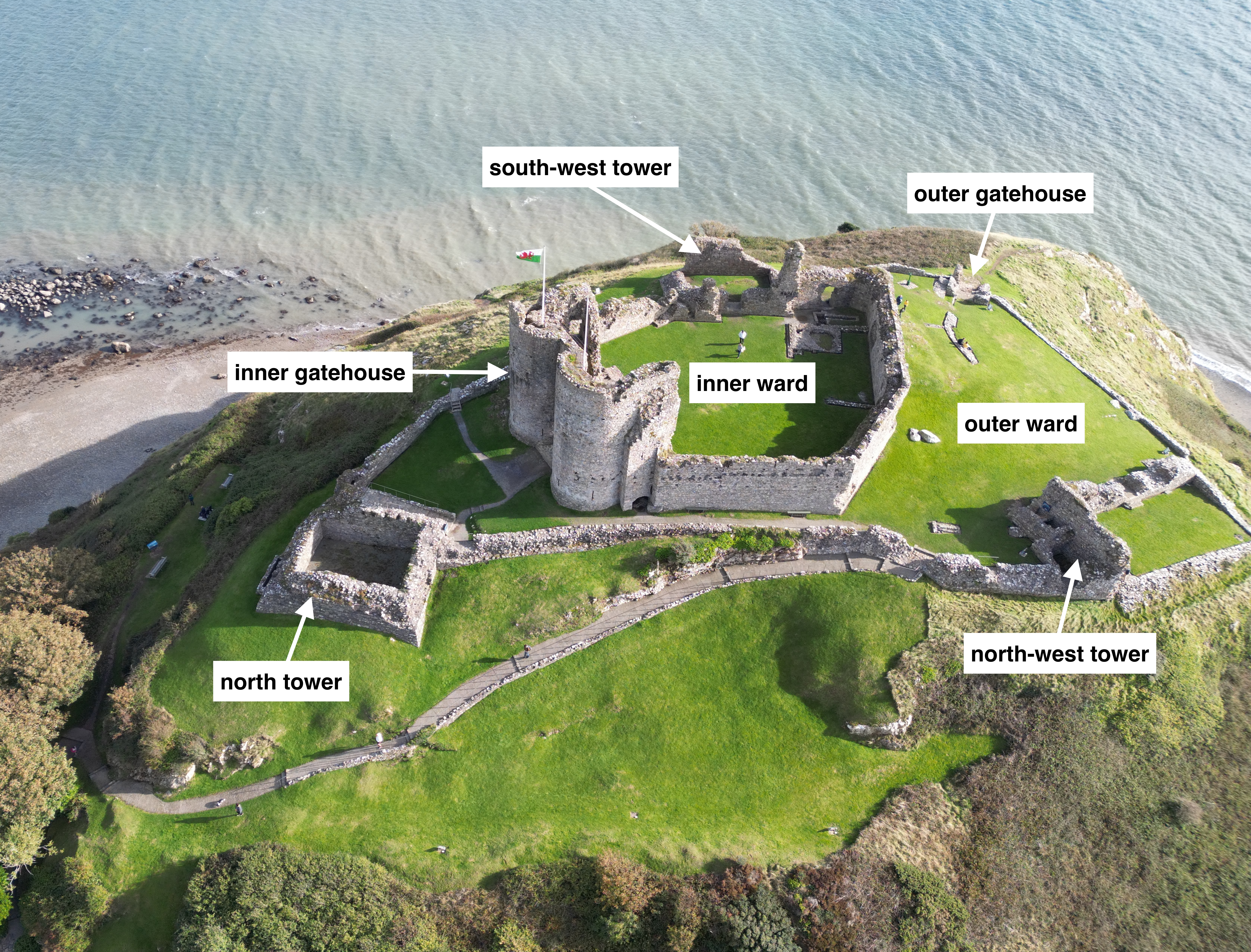
A labelled aerial image of the castle (Note: Labels taken from Avent (1989).)

The castle occupies a rocky headland on the coast. It is almost concentric, with an inner ward surrounded by an outer ward on all sides but the south-east. The inner ward forms an irregular six-sided enclosure and contains a twin-towered gatehouse on the north side and a tower on the south-east. The outer ward is roughly triangular, following the shape of the headland, and contains towers in the north and south-west corners and a modest gatehouse in the south-east. The landward side of the castle is defended by two ditches.

As noted above, the general consensus is that the castle was built in three main phases. The first phase consists of the work undertaken in the 1230s for Llywelyn ap Iorwerth, probably consisting of the inner ward. The second phase was undertaken some time between 1255 and 1282 for Llywelyn ap Gruffudd, and the third phase of work undertaken between 1283 and 1292 for Edward I of England and between 1307 and 1327 for Edward II of England. The first two phases account for the majority of the fabric, with the third mainly consisting of improvements to the Welsh structure.

=== Inner ward ===
The inner gatehouse is the most prominent part of the castle, surviving almost to full height on its three outer sides. It consists of two D-shaped towers with a gate passage between them and was built in three phases. The first phase is Llywelyn ap Iorwerth's initial construction, which consists of approximately the bottom three-quarters of the building. The second phase was probably undertaken by Edward I and raised the height of the gatehouse, creating new battlements and holes for a hoarding. The third phase is probably part of the repairs undertaken by Edward II and heightened the gatehouse again; it blocked the second-phase battlements and created new ones above, one of which survives on the eastern tower. The gate arch is a reconstruction. The rear wall of the gatehouse is ruinous, but the remains of the stair to the first floor survive on the east side. The stair was also constructed in three phases, the first two consisting of the original stair and a subsequent widening under Llywelyn ap Gruffudd. Under Edward I it was widened again and the first phase built up to form a platform, which probably formed the base for a wooden stair which led up to the wall-walk of the curtain wall. A lobby off this wall-walk gave access to the second floor of the gatehouse and to a straight stair in the thickness of the gatehouse wall, which led to its wall-walk.

The inner gatehouse

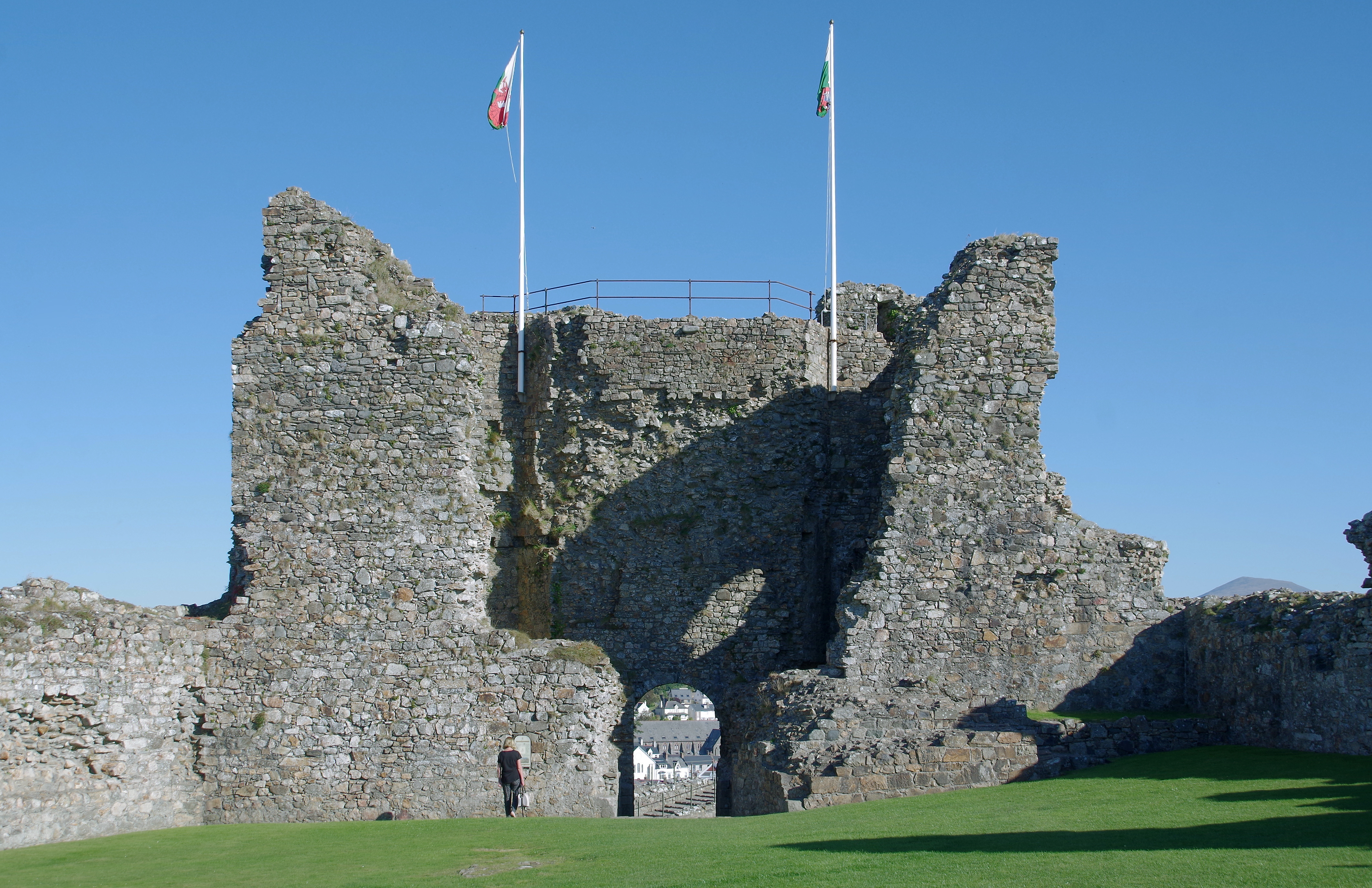
The rear of the inner gatehouse. The base of the staircase is visible on the right.

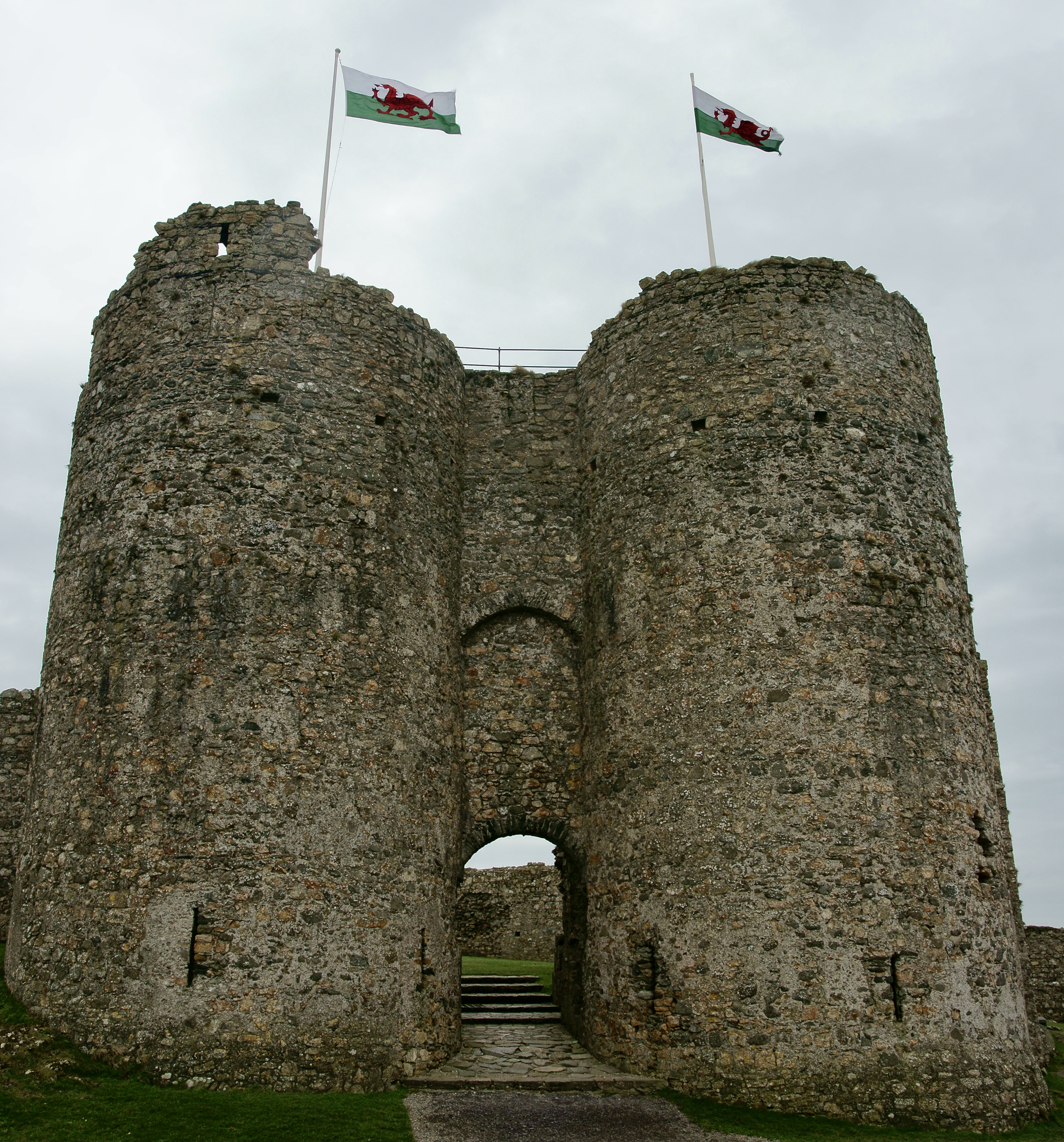
The outside of the gatehouse. The first building phase includes everything up to the row of holes visible on the right-hand tower. The second phase includes the masonry above those holes and below the level of the arrowloop on the left-hand tower, which belongs to the third phase.

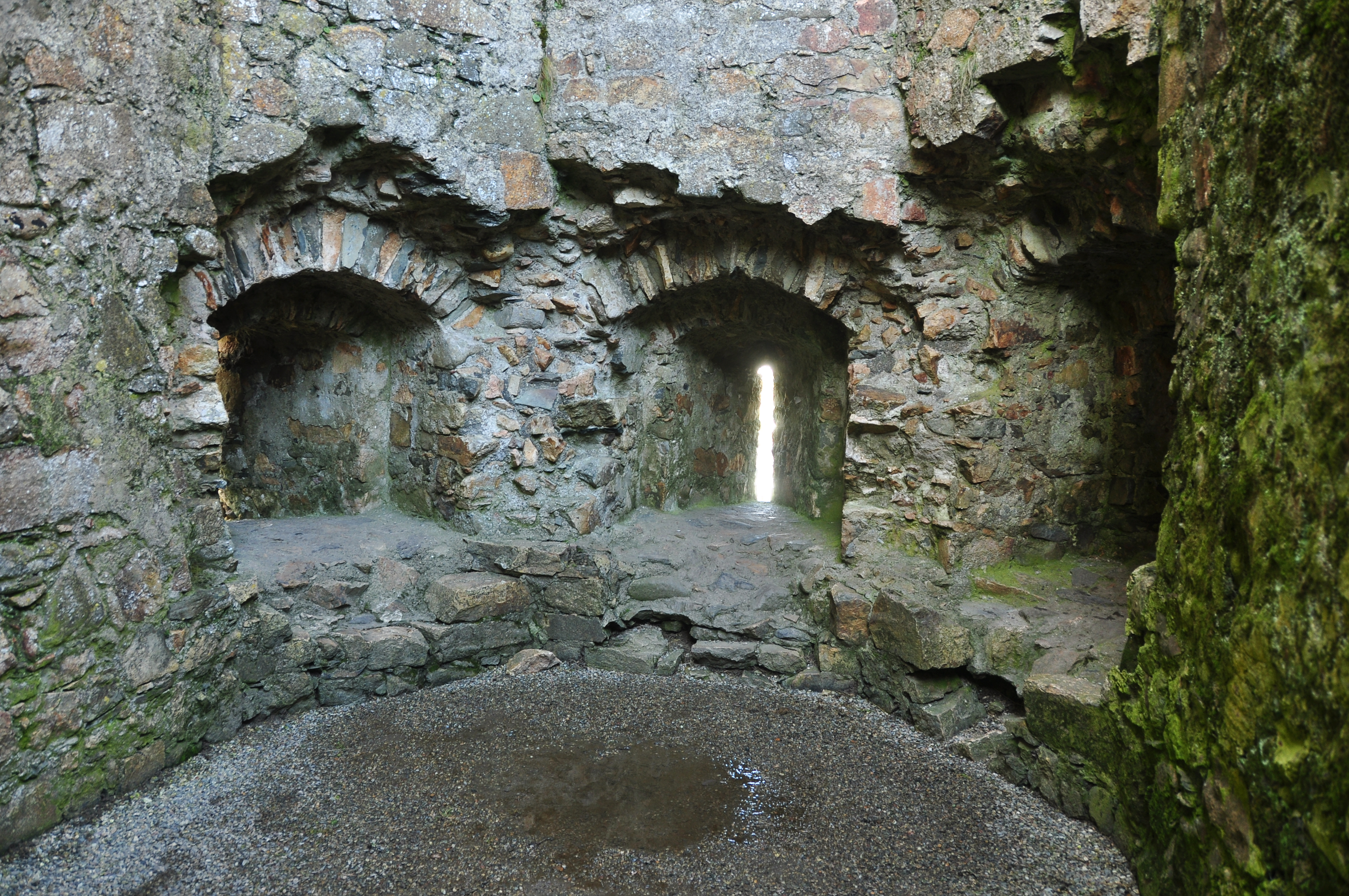
The interior of one of the inner gatehouse guardrooms, showing the three embrasures

The centre of the ground floor of the gatehouse is occupied by the gate passage. It was protected by a portcullis, the grooves for which partially survive just within the gate arch, and a pair of doors approximately halfway along. There is a water cistern at the rear of the passage, fed by a natural spring. Just before the cistern are the doors into two near-identical guard chambers, which occupy the ground floors of the towers. Each chamber contains three arrowslits which guard the approach to the gatehouse. The first and second storeys were probably divided by wooden partitions into smaller chambers, but it is possible that the first floor was undivided and used as a hall. At each level there is a latrine accessed from a projection on the west tower. One of the chambers in the west tower may have been a chapel, as a crucifix was found during excavations of the ground floor. It is probable that both upper floors were primarily lit by windows in the ruined rear wall; the only surviving window is at first-floor level in the east tower. The rear wall may also have contained fireplaces, as fragments of late thirteenth- or early fourteenth-century chimney were also found during excavations.

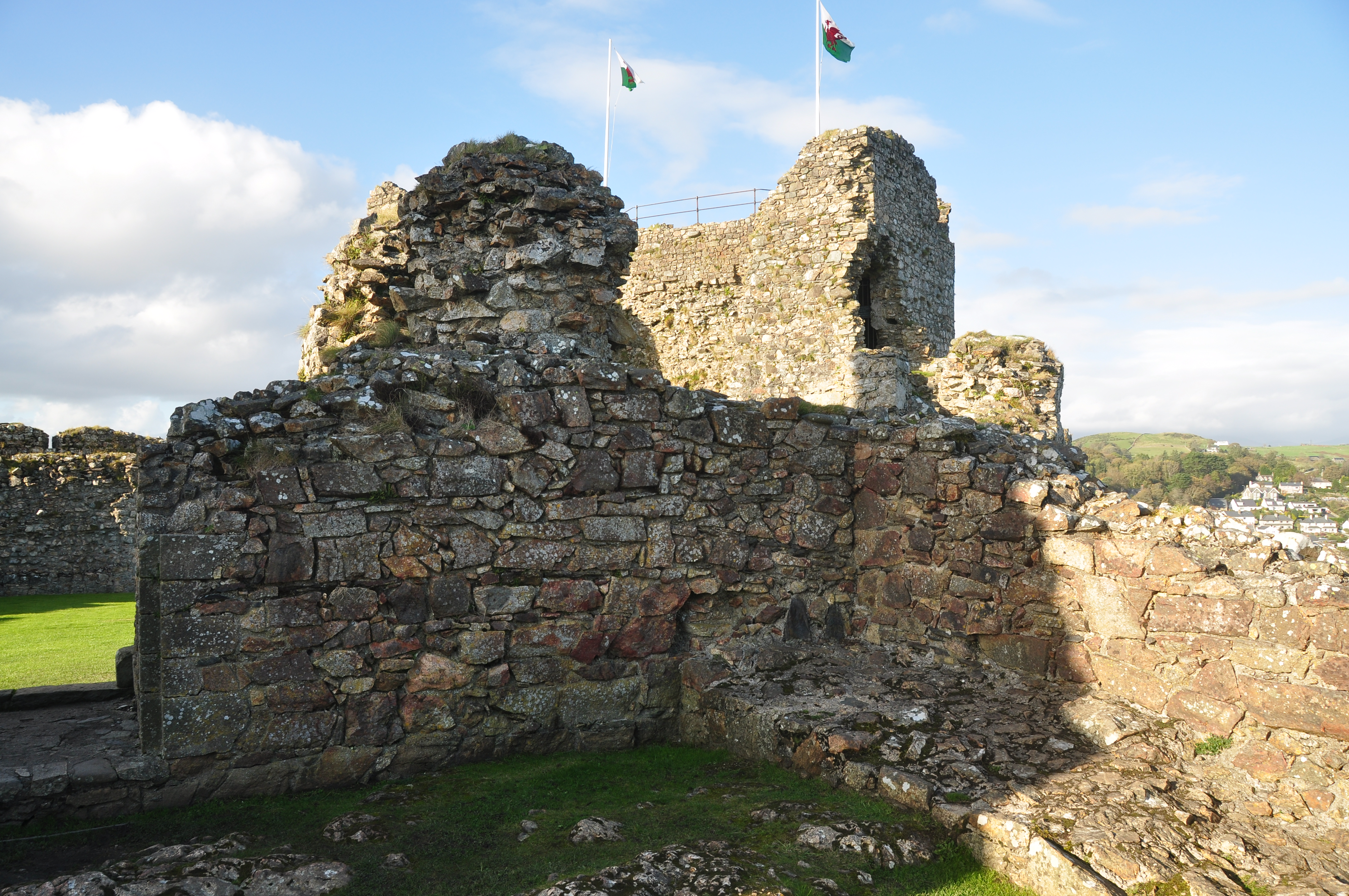
The interior of the south-east tower, with the base of the staircase on the right

The other major feature of the inner ward is the south-east tower, which is contemporary with the gatehouse but was refaced both internally and externally under Edward I. Its western wall stands to approximately 6.1 m (20 ft) and contains the remains of a fireplace, but it is otherwise ruined. The ground floor would originally have been accessed via a ladder from the floor above, but was later entered from a doorway which was probably inserted by Llywelyn ap Gruffudd. The interior of the tower contains the base of a staircase contemporary with the refacing, but this was either left incomplete or later dismantled. There are latrine chutes on the east and west sides of the tower which suggest that it was of three storeys. Four chutes in the adjoining section of curtain wall to the north are part of the original construction, and served latrines at ground and first-floor level. A staircase was built over the ground-floor entrance to these latrines when the tower was refaced, and provided access to the wall-walk and possibly the first floor of the tower. A stone channel for a lead pipe survives on the exterior of the east side, which fed a cistern.

The remainder of the ward is enclosed by a curtain wall, which stands to almost its full height except for the stretch between the gatehouse and south-east tower. The wall-walk survives on the southern and western stretches, as well as the parapet and half an embrasure where the wall meets the west gatehouse tower. Little trace remains of the buildings which stood against the wall, but footings and beam-holes indicate that they existed, as does a 1292 reference to the "king's hall". In the south-east corner, adjacent to the tower, is the south gate, a simple opening which originally served as a postern and later as a means of communication between the two wards. It is uncertain what the square area of cobbles adjacent to the gate represents, but it may have been an oven.

=== Outer ward ===
The north tower survives to the base of its first floor, the level of which is indicated by beam-holes in the south-east corner. It is battered on its three outer sides and the north-east wall contains two pairs of latrine chutes, suggesting that the tower had two floors. A flight of wide, shallow steps was built against the inner wall by Edward I, and running south-west from their base is a cobbled platform. These features have been interpreted as being for the transportation of ammunition for an engine mounted on the tower.

The south-west tower is the largest in the outer ward, but the most ruinous. Its lower walls are contemporary with the rest of the outer ward, but the western corner has almost entirely vanished. As originally built the tower may have consisted of two storeys and resembled the original form of the east tower of Dolwyddelan Castle, built by Llywelyn ap Iorwerth. There are flat stones on the ground which probably carried a wooden floor. The upper walls have been refaced, probably under Edward I; at the same time a doorway was inserted into the ground floor, a staircase built against the north-east wall to give access to the first floor, and a second floor probably added. The staircase blocked a pre-existing embrasure in the curtain wall. The tower was richly decorated; the doors to the staircase and first floor are chamfered and decorated with ball-stops, and archaeological finds from the interior include two corbels, one carved with foliage and the other with a human head, and a foliate capital.

The outer gatehouse was originally a simple passage through the curtain wall with a doorway at its inner end. Shortly afterward a second gate was added at the outer end of the passage and its eastern wall thickened, which necessitated lengthening the embrasure on this side. The thickened wall may have extended to the southern corner of the inner ward, controlling access to its southern gate. Finally, under Edward I a simple barbican was constructed in front of the gatehouse.

In contrast to the inner curtain wall, the outer curtain wall does not survive to a high level and as a result few features remain. Between the south-east tower and the inner gatehouse is a thicker portion of wall which probably marks the site of a stair to the wall-walk. The stretch between the south-west and north towers contains the bases of several embrasures, including the one blocked by the south-west tower stair. The centre of this section of wall is narrow to accommodate a passage between the curtains, which was originally roofed over; the narrowness of the outer wall here is an indication that it post-dates the inner.

The outer ward

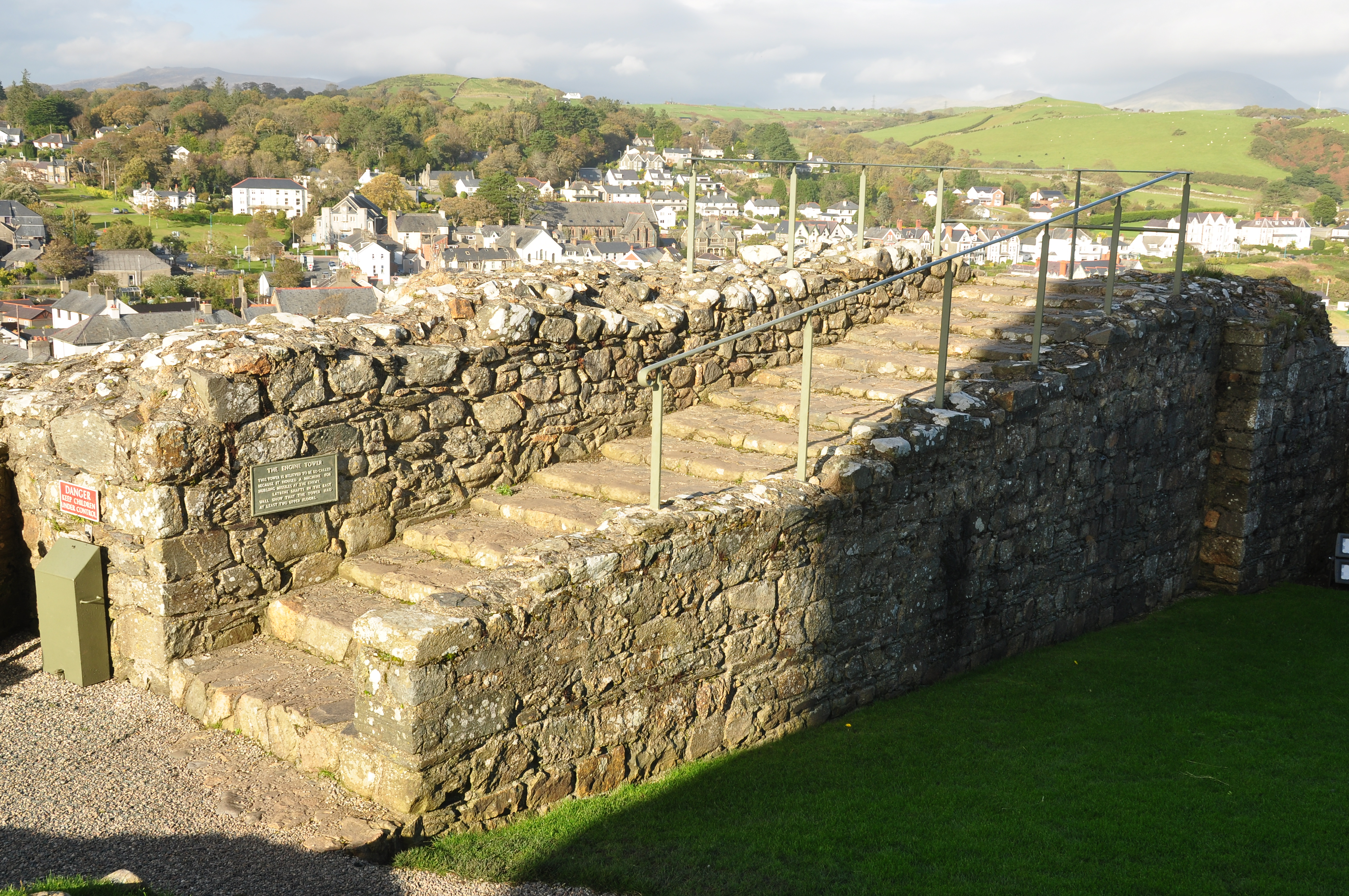
The ramp to the north tower

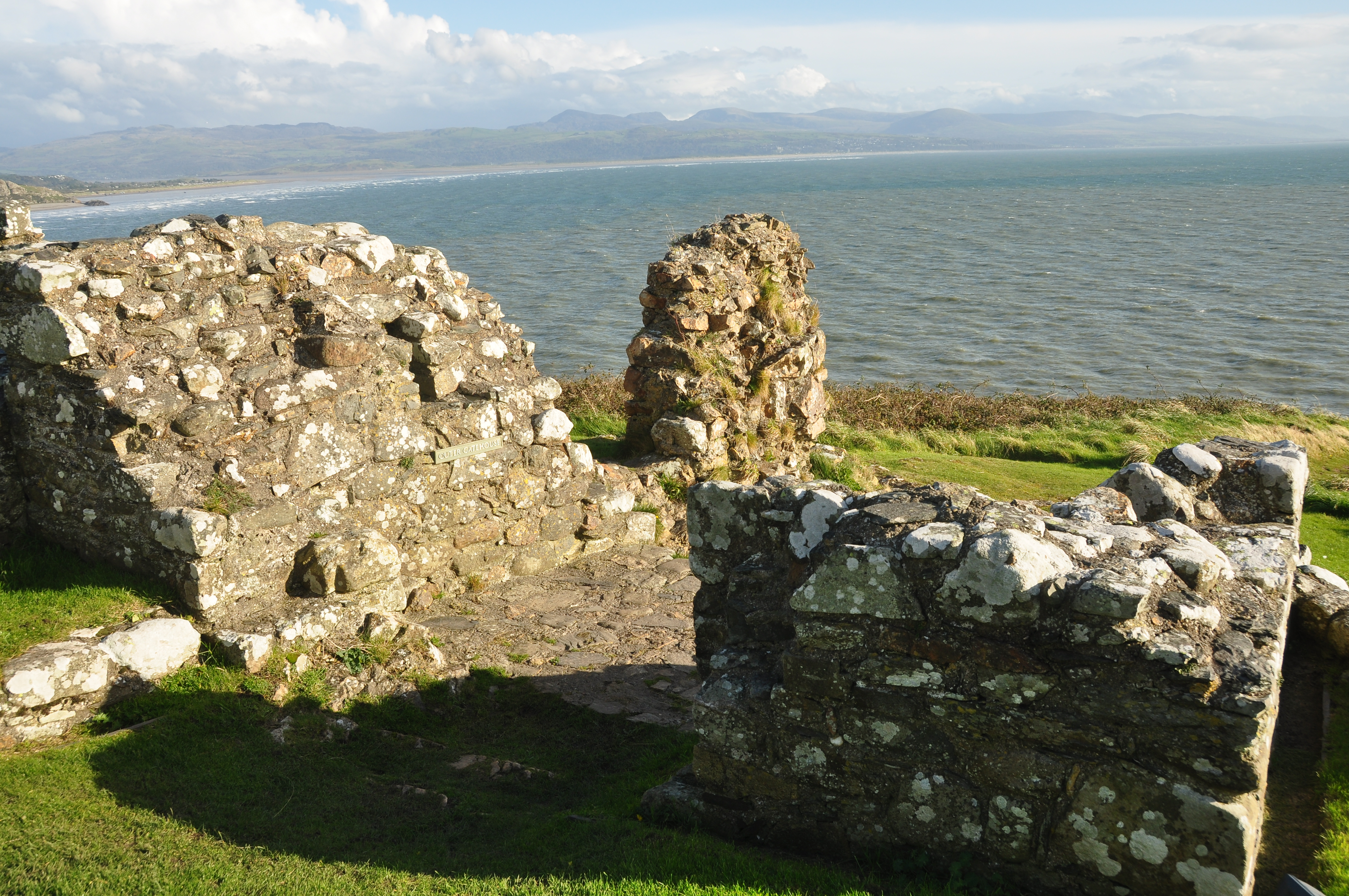
The outer gatehouse from the outer ward, looking south-west

== List of Constables ==
- 1284: William de Leybourne (Sir William Leyburn)
- ?–1309: William le Butiller
- 1309–1316: William Trumwyn
- 1316–?: John de Welles
- 1317–1321: Oillard de Welles
- 1321–?: John de Swennerton
- 1322–1326: Thomas Jay
- 1326–1327: William de Shaldeford
- 1327: Richard de Munemuth
- 1330–?: Richard de Holland
- 1333: Richard de Allespath
- 1333–death: Richard de Holland (restored)
- ?–1338: Robert de Hambury
- 1338–1343: John le Strange of Muddle
- c. 1347 – c. 1359: William de St Omer
- 1359–?1381: Syr Hywel y Fwyall (Hywel ap Gruffudd)
- 1381–1391: Thomas Beushef
- 1391–?: William Frodesham
- 1396–1398: William Hugon
- ?–1398: John Gamull
- 1398–?: William Hugon and John Gamull

Source: Rickard

== See also ==
- Castles in Great Britain and Ireland
- List of castles in Wales
