= Frank Carlton =

Frank Carlton may refer to:

- Frank Carlton (rugby league) (1936–2009), English professional rugby league footballer
- Frank Carlton (politician) (1935–2009), American lawyer and politician
