= Kilburn Grammar School =

Former grammar school in London, England

Coordinates: 51.5395°N 0.2082°W

Kilburn Grammar School was an English grammar school which opened in 1898 in Kilburn, north-west London. The school ceased to exist in 1967.

== History ==
The school's history is detailed in a book by Richard E Brock. It was founded by the Rev. Dr. Henry George Bonavia Hunt, vicar of St Paul's, Kilburn, at a time when there was no general state provision for secondary education. The new boys' school opened in one room at 1 Willesden Lane in January 1898, then occupied two rooms at the Polytechnic Institute at Priory Park Road, before moving in 1899 to a house at 28 Cavendish Road.

In April 1900, the school began moving to new purpose-built premises at Salusbury Road. In July 1900 the Hampstead and Highgate Express reported that the school's hall was opened by Bishop Mandell Creighton. Old boys of the school became known as 'Old Creightonians'. In 1907, the school was purchased jointly by the Urban District of Willesden and Middlesex County Council to become the first state secondary school in the borough, run by the higher education committee made up of representatives of both local authorities. Fees were charged until these were abolished by the Education Act 1944 for all state schools.

In 1964, London's local government was reorganised. As a result, Middlesex County Council and the Municipal Borough of Willesden were abolished in 1965, being replaced by a new London Borough of Brent, which had sole responsibility for education. An early decision by the new authority was to close the grammar school (and others) and create a new boys' school on the premises, Kilburn Senior High School. This had a comprehensive intake at 13, and started in September 1967. While the existing (age 14+) pupils completed their traditional grammar school education, by the early 1970s only the buildings and a diminishing number of teachers who had stayed on were left. The traditions of the school including the house system, societies, and its sporting name, were long gone.

In 1973, KSHS merged with the girls' school Brondesbury and Kilburn High School (established in 1892) on the opposite side of the road to form Brondesbury and Kilburn High School, also comprehensive. In 1989, this school, in turn, merged with others and moved to a different site to form Queens Park Community School. The former Edwardian grammar school premises in Salusbury Road were sold by the borough in 1989 and are now occupied by the Islamia Girls' School (fee-paying) and Islamia Primary School (voluntary-aided).

== Notable alumni ==
- Jarvis Astaire, boxing promoter, film producer, chairman from 1993–2005 of the Greyhound Racing Association
- Richard Baker, BBC newsreader from 1954 to 1982, broadcaster
- Professor Michael Chanan, film director and author
- Professor Clifford Ballard, pioneer in orthodontics and its teaching
- Richard Barnes, journalist and author
- Sir Michael Beavis KCB, CBE, AFC, former Deputy Commander-in-Chief, Allied Forces, Central Europe
- Sir Samuel Brittan, economic journalist
- Harold Carlton, writer and journalist
- Prof Ronald Coase, Chief Statistician from 1941–1946, economist and winner of 1991 Nobel Memorial Prize in Economic Sciences
- Michael Cockerell, broadcaster
- Roland Collins, painter
- Professor Paul Philip Craig, QC, expert in administrative and European law
- Clive Donner, film director
- Alan Ereira, author, historian, documentary maker
- Sir Morris Finer, judge
- Sir William Glanville, civil engineer, President, 1950–1951, of the Institution of Civil Engineers
- Prof Karl W. Gruenberg, Professor of Pure Mathematics from 1967–1993 at Queen Mary College
- Gil Hayward, wartime cryptographer
- Bernard Holley, actor
- Ken Howard, artist
- Mike Hurst musician and record producer (Michael Pickworth when at KGS)
- Allen Hutt, newspaper manager and communist activist
- Prof. Jonathan Israel, historian
- Laurence Keen, President, 1989–2004, of the British Archaeological Association
- Paul Kriwaczek, BBC TV producer of The Computer Programme
- Terence Marsh, film and television production designer
- David Nathan, music writer and authority on soul music
- Osborne Peasgood, organist of Westminster Abbey, 1941–1946, and for the wedding of the Queen in 1947, and the 1937 and 1953 coronations
- Edmund 'Ted' Percey, architect
- Jonathan Rees-Williams, organist and Master of the Choristers, 1991–2002 at St. George's Chapel, Windsor Castle and organist, 1978–1991, of Lichfield Cathedral
- Bernard Shrimsley, editor, 1971–1975, of The Sun and, 1975–1980, of the News of the World
- Rabbi Daniel Sperber, historian, Professor of Talmudic Studies at Bar-Ilan University, Israel
- Reginald Stafford, aircraft designer of the Handley Page Victor
- Norman Strauss, businessman and policy advisor to Mrs Thatcher from 1977
- Sir Guenter Heinz Treitel, Vinerian Professor of English Law, 1979–1996, at the University of Oxford
- Prof. Robert Wistrich, historian, director of the Vidal Sassoon International Center for the Study of Antisemitism
- Brian Winston, Lincoln Professor of Communications since 2007 at the University of Lincoln

Kilburn Grammar School's old boys' association was established in 1919, and celebrated its centenary in 2019. It has around 400 members, all of whom attended or taught at the school before its closure in 1967.
