= Kriwaczek =

Kriwaczek is a surname. Notable people with the surname include:

- Paul Kriwaczek (1937–2011), British historian and television producer
- Rohan Kriwaczek, British writer, composer, and violinist
