= Justice Carlton =

Justice Carlton may refer to:

- J. Phil Carlton (born 1938), associate justice of the North Carolina Supreme Court
- Vassar B. Carlton (1912–2005), associate justice of the Florida Supreme Court
