= Senator Carlton =

Senator Carlton may refer to:

- Doyle E. Carlton (1885–1972), Florida State Senate
- Doyle E. Carlton Jr. (1922–2003), Florida State Senate
- Henry Hull Carlton (1835–1905), Georgia State Senate
- Lisa Carlton (born 1964), Florida State Senate
- Maggie Carlton (born 1957), Nevada State Senate
- Neely C. Carlton (born 1970), Mississippi State Senate
