= Prophets of the Ghost Ants =

Science-fiction/fantasy novel

Prophets of the Ghost Ants=
- First edition
- Author: Clark Thomas Carlton
- Cover artist: Mozchops
- Language: English
- Genre: Science fiction and fantasy
- Publisher: HarperCollins
- Publication date: 12/13/2016
- Publication place: United States of America
- Media type: Print and ebook
- Pages: 597
- ISBN: 978-0-06-242975-9

Prophets of the Ghost Ants is a science-fiction/fantasy novel by Clark Thomas Carlton. It is Book One of The Antasy Series published by HarperCollins Voyager on 13 December 2016.

== Setting ==
The novel is set on the planet Earth in a distant future following a massive asteroid impact that has reduced land mass and extinguished all reptilian, avian and mammalian life. The one exception to mammalian extinction is humans which have adapted by growing smaller and smaller over the eons until they are no taller than a few millimeters. The other survivors are insects and other arthropods which have increased in size in an oxygen rich world. Humankind's survival relies not in battling insects but by intertwining with them to live as their parasites or symbionts. Different tribes and races of humans have yoked different insects to their service, mostly ants, which results in a constant state of warfare due to territorial expansion.

== Story ==
The main characters are Anand the Roach Boy and his cousin, Pleckoo the Noseless, who are outcastes in the United Queendoms of the Great and Holy Slope, a highly stratified nation that exploits the leaf cutter ants that farm and eat a nourishing fungus. Among the outcastes, Anand is further degraded because his mother is a Britasyte, a member of a traveling roach people. Both Anand and Pleckoo work in the midden or the dung/trash heap of Mound Cajoria which is one of a hundred different human-occupied ant mounds within the Slopeish nation. When Cajoria becomes overpopulated, the priests of the mound conduct a Fission rite in which a third of the population of both ants and humans are selected by lottery to establish a new colony in the unknown north of Dranveria. Both Anand and Pleckoo are selected as pioneers of the new colony but Pleckoo defects to Hulkren, a rising nation in the neglected Dustlands whose warriors have parasitized the powerful and nocturnal ghost ants. Anand continues north to encounter an unknown society which has domesticated the red hunter ant.

== History of the novel ==
Carlton was working as a script doctor, ghost writer and screenwriter in Hollywood when he determined to write his "passion project" following the collapse of another film project. The novel had gestated since the mid 90s when he observed two different kinds of ants battling over a fallen peanut under a chaise longue in Cozumel, Mexico. The story came to him at the Burning Man Festival of 2002 after an overdose of LSD. That night, Carlton wandered the different camps of the festival before he hiked deep into the desert, and then sat and stared into a blackened sky "where the plot unraveled like a streaming Technicolor prophecy." The novel took three years to write.

Carlton delivered the first draft of the novel, originally titled The Ghost Ants of Hulkren to the writing/producing team of Michael Colleary and Mike Werb who had hired Carlton to write the novelization of their screen project Face/Off. Michael Colleary | Writer, Producer, Script and Continuity Department Werb and Colleary immediately optioned the novel and teamed with film producer Lawrence Bender to develop a screen project. Bender called the novel "one of the most engrossing, original and powerful novels I have read in years." Clark Thomas Carlton The novel had the interest of animator Conrad Vernon and director Michael Bay as a live action project for Sony Pictures, but a deal was never completed and all screen rights have reverted to Carlton. At the urging of his agent, Carlton self-published the novel through Create Space in 2011. The book's success as an indy novel began when it was selected as the group read of Apocalypse Whenever, the largest reading group at Goodreads. Apocalypse Whenever The novel was acquired by Festa Verlag for the Deltus imprint and translated into German as Die Geisterameisen von Hulkren. Die Geisterameisen von Hulkren : Clark Thomas Carlton: Amazon.de: Books In 2015, the novel was acquired by HarperCollins for the Voyager imprint as Book 1 of The Antasy Series and published in December 2016. Book Two of the Antasy series, The Prophet of the Termite God will be released in April 2019 with a third sequel scheduled for 2021.

== Critical reception ==
Prophets of the Ghost Ants was named a Best of 2011 by Kirkus Reviews. Writing for Kirkus, reviewer Perry Crowe called it "intensely memorable … a gripping read … a fascinating, enjoyable sci-fi yarn."

Writing for Galaxy's Edge Magazine, author/critic Paul Cook wrote, "I had my proverbial socks knocked off ... extraordinary scope of imagination ... it's a great novel ... a classic ... a tour-de-force of the imagination ... a perfect example of very skillful storytelling, something the field could use more of. The novel never flags, every word counts ... It's got all the sense of wonder that's missing in science fiction today. I simply could not put this book down."

In his review for Best E-Books, Ken Korczak wrote "Readers who dare enter the realm of Prophets of the Ghost Ants should be prepared to be carried off, as if by a giant swarm of locusts, to a world of epic fantasy that rivals The Lord of the Rings and is on par with the likes of Dune or Watership Down."

== Illustrated version ==
An illustrated version of Part One of the novel by Carlton and illustrator Mozchops was briefly published as an e-book and dissolved after the novel was acquired by HarperCollins. Carlton has stated he would "love to work with Mozchops again," an illustrator whose work Carlton has called "the Sistine Chapel of insect art."
