= Sir Hywel y Fwyall =

Castellan of Criccieth from 1359 to c. 1381

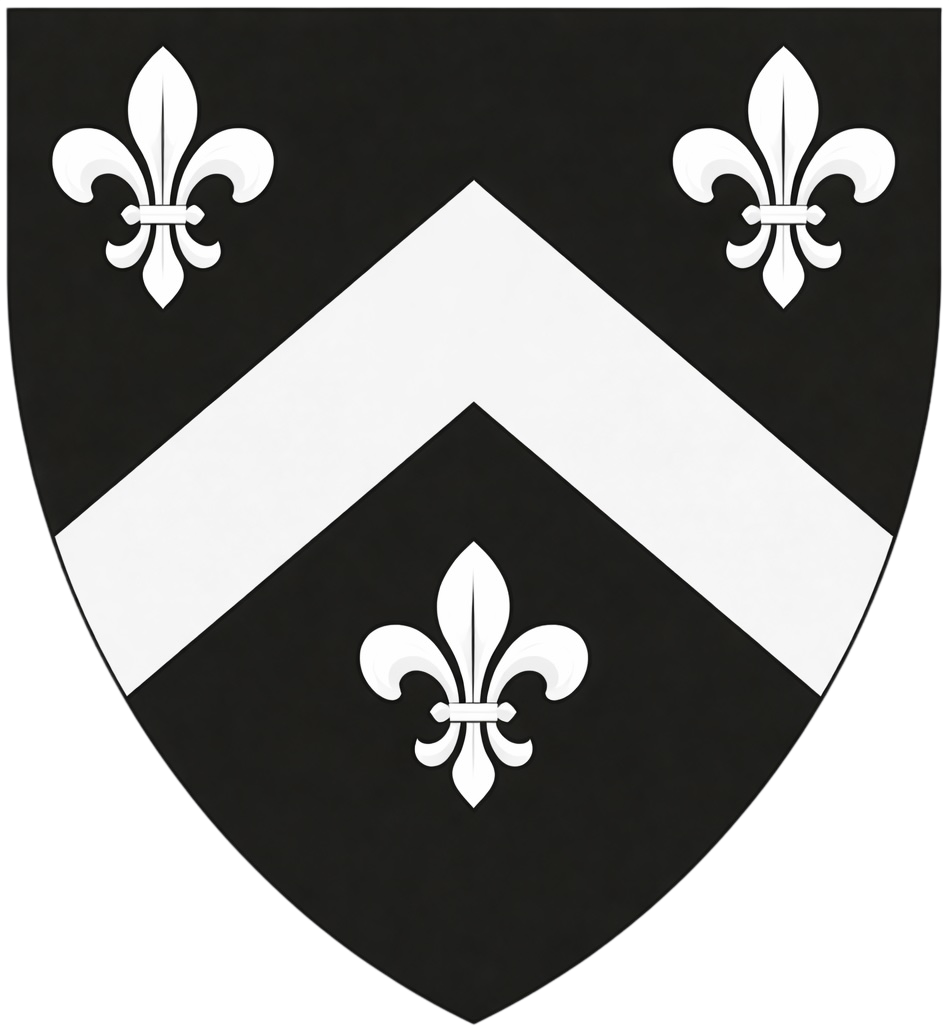
- Arms of Sir Hywel y Fwyall

Castellan of Criccieth
- In office 1359 – c. 1381
- Monarchs: Edward of Woodstock; Richard of Bordeaux
- Preceded by: William de St Omer
- Succeeded by: Thomas Beushef

Personal details
- Died: c. 1381
- Spouses: Lleucu; Tangwystl ferch Dafydd Fychan
- Children: Ednyfed Ddu; Lleucu; Einion; Mallt
- Parents: Gruffudd ap Hywel (father); Gwerful ferch Tegwared (mother)

Sir Hywel y Fwyall ap Gruffudd (died c. 1381) was a Welsh knight.

== Military career ==
Hywel was one of the Welshmen who fought at the Battle of Poitiers in 1356, and Welsh tradition made him out to be the actual captor of John II of France, "cutting off his horse's head at one blow" (Note: ib.p.80n.)

Hywel seems to have fought well, for he was knighted by Edward the Black Prince, and was made Constable of Criccieth Castle in 1359, as well as being given the rent of Dee Mills at Chester, "besides other great things in North Wales". As a memorial of his services, a mess of meat was ordered to be served before his axe in perpetuity, the food being afterwards given to the poor "for his soul's health". Hywel was also "raglot" or bailiff of Aberglaslyn, and died "between Michaelmas 2 and the same time 6 Rich. II", leaving two sons, Meredydd, who lived in Eifionydd; and Dafydd, who lived at Henblas, near Llanrwst. (Note: ib. p. 30 and n.; Williams, Eminent Welshmen)

== Family ==
The bard Iolo Goch describes his family in a poem: his wife was "Tanglwst, daughter of one Dafydd Fychan ap Hywel; there was one son, Gruffydd, who left no direct heirs". But several of the Eifionydd families have descended from his elder brother, Einion.
