= Eugene Clarke =

American politician (born 1956)

Eugene S. Clarke

Member of the Mississippi Senate from the 22nd district
- In office January 6, 2004 – January 7, 2020
- Preceded by: Neely C. Carlton
- Succeeded by: Joseph C. Thomas

Personal details
- Born: April 4, 1956 (age 70) Greenville, Mississippi, USA
- Party: Republican
- Spouse: Paula Watkins
- Children: 3
- Education: Mississippi State University
- Occupation: Politician

Eugene S. Clarke (born April 4, 1956) is a Republican former member of the Mississippi State Senate who resides in Hollandale in Washington County in western Mississippi.

== Early life ==
Clarke was born in Greenville, Mississippi. He graduated from Mississippi State University at Starkville, at which he was a member of the Sigma Alpha Epsilon fraternity.

== Personal life ==
An accountant, Clarke is married to the former Paula Watkins. They have three children. He is a Methodist.
