= Trevor Carlton =

American painter of Disney fine art

- Born: Monte Carlton; November 17, 1972 (age 53)
- Occupation: painter

Monte "Trevor" Carlton (born November 17, 1972) is an American painter of Disney fine art. His artwork is prominently displayed at most of the Disney theme parks around the world. Carlton is also known for his performance piece in which he paints Disney characters in a matter of minutes, all set to music.

== Style ==
Carlton's paintings combine a distressed, wood-like appearance with a fresh, contemporary style. He accomplishes this by first painting a faux wood finish onto normal canvas. Once this is complete, Carlton paints the character and scene over the finish. He ends the process by removing some of the paint with sandpaper. This gives his work a sense of nostalgia, which he considers appropriate for Disney characters.

== Quotes ==
"I want people to imagine they found my artwork in some old run down movie theater basement. Unpreserved and forgotten, an antique bearing the nostalgia and character that only time can bring."
