= Mabry A. Carlton =

American politician

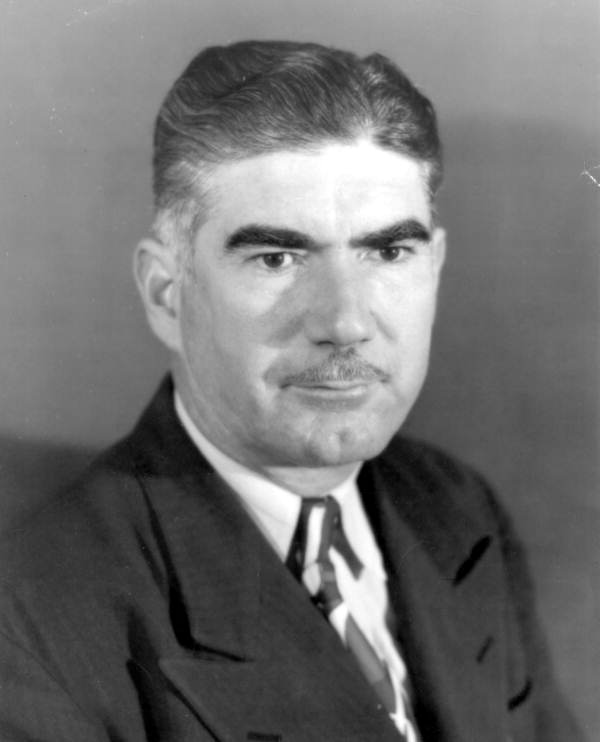
- Carlton in 1949

Member of the Florida House of Representatives from Duval County
- In office 1943–1945
- In office 1949–1951

Personal details
- Born: January 4, 1903 Zolfo Springs, Florida, U.S.
- Died: June 13, 1959 (aged 56)
- Party: Democratic
- Education: University of Florida

Mabry A. Carlton (January 4, 1903 – June 13, 1959) was an American politician. He served as a Democratic member of the Florida House of Representatives.

== Life and career ==
Carlton was born in Zolfo Springs, Florida. He attended the University of Florida.

Carlton served in the Florida House of Representatives from 1943 to 1945 and again from 1949 to 1951.

Carlton died on June 13, 1959, in a boating accident, at the age of 56.
