= Clifford Ballard =

British orthodontist

- Born: 26 June 1910
- Died: 16 July 1997 (aged 87)
- Education: Charing Cross Hospital Medical School
- Known for: First Orthodontic Professor in England
- Medical career
- Profession: Dentist
- Sub-specialties: Orthodontist

Clifford Ballard (26 June 1910 – 16 July 1997) was a British orthodontist. He became England's first Professor of Orthodontics in 1956. He served as the President of BSSO in 1957.

== Life ==
He attended Royal Dental Hospital in 1934. He then studied medicine at Charing Cross Hospital Medical School and graduated from there in 1940. He became an orthodontist in Middlesex County the same year. In 1948, he joined the Institute of Dental Surgery at the Eastman Dental Hospital as Head of the Orthodontic Department. Ballard's interest in the field pertained to the respiratory function and the effects of orofacial musculature on malocclusions. During his stay at the Eastman Hospital, he organized a two-day symposium for the orthodontists in the country. In 1961. With the help of John Hovell he formed the Consultant Orthodontists Group (COG).

He married Muriel Burling in 1937 and had two children, a son and a daughter.

== Ballard Conversion Tracing ==
Ballard described a method for studying the jaw relationship in the Antero-Posterior direction in 1951. This method used the axial inclination of the incisor teeth to study the relationship. This method removes any influence of soft tissues and dental compensation and permits an adjustment to the inclination of the maxillary and mandibular incisors to their normal value in respect to maxillary and mandibular planes. This method uses incisor overjet as the indicator of the relative position of the maxilla to the mandible. Thus the overjet describes the skeletal discrepancy.

== Recognition ==
- BSSO - President (1957)
- Colyer Gold Medal presented by Royal Dental Surgeon
