= Paul Kriwaczek =

British historian and broadcaster (1937–2011)

Paul Kriwaczek (30 November 1937 - 2 March 2011) was a British historian and television producer.

== Life ==
He was born in Vienna, the capital of Austria, on 30 November 1937. He escaped from Nazi Austria to England in 1939. He attended Kilburn Grammar School in London and studied at the London Hospital Medical School.

== Career ==
Kriwaczek became supervisor for Persian language service for BBC External Services, the predecessor of the BBC World Service, in the late 1960s. In 1970 he moved to television and was producer for documentaries, initially in the Science and Features department and then in the Education department. In 1988 he became executive producer.

== Books ==
- In Search of Zarathustra: Across Iran and Central Asia to Find the World's First Prophet (2002)
- Babylon: Mesopotamia And The Birth Of Civilization (2010)
- Yiddish Civilisation: The Rise and Fall of a Forgotten Nation (2005), Random House, ISBN 978-1-4000-3377-5
- E=mc²: The Great Ideas that Shaped Our World
- Documentary for the Small Screen (1997)
