= Thad H. Carlton =

American politician (1906–1965)

Member of the Florida House of Representatives from St. Lucie County
- In office 1943

Personal details
- Born: February 28, 1906 Fort Pierce, Florida, U.S.
- Died: September 1965 (aged 59)
- Party: Democratic
- Education: University of Florida

Thad H. Carlton (February 28, 1906 – September 1965) was an American politician. He served as a Democratic member of the Florida House of Representatives.

== Life and career ==
Carlton was born in Fort Pierce, Florida. He attended the University of Florida.

Carlton served in the Florida House of Representatives in 1943.

Carlton died in September 1965, at the age of 59.
