= Laurence Keen =

British archeologist

Laurence John Keen
- Born: 1943 (age 82–83); London, United Kingdom
- Education: Kilburn Grammar School; York St John University; UCL Institute of Archaeology; University College London
- Occupation: Archaeologist
- Awards: OBE, MPhil, FSA, FRHistS, MCIfA, FSAScot

Laurence John Keen (born 1943), is a British archaeologist, historian, author and art expert. He served as the County Archaeologist for Dorset from 1975 to 1999 and was President of the British Archaeological Association from 1984 to 2004. In 2000 he was appointed as an officer of the Order of the British Empire for 'services to archaeology'.

== Early life ==
Born in London in 1943, Keen is the elder son of the late John William Frederick Keen, an engineer, and Dorothy Ethel Keen, née French. He was educated at Kilburn Grammar School, St John's College York (CertEd, Music), the Institute of Archaeology (PGDip, European Archaeology, Gordon Childe Memorial Prize), and University College London (MPhil, Archaeology).

== Career ==
Keen was the Director of the Southampton Archaeological Research Committee before being awarded the post of County Archaeologist for Dorset in 1975. Since then he has served on numerous national and international archaeological committees including the St George's Chapel Fabric Advisory Committee, Windsor Castle, for which he was chair from 1999 to 2004, the Exeter Cathedral Fabric Advisory Committee, for which he is currently chair, and the Gloucester Cathedral Fabric Advisory Committee.

Keen joined the British Archaeological Association in 1968 and was elected president in 1984, serving in this capacity until 2004.

Keen is currently the longest serving board member and Trustee of Oxford Archaeology.

Keen is a member of the Chartered Institute for Archaeologists (MCIfA) as well as Fellow of the Royal Historical Society and the Society of Antiquaries.

== Selected excavations ==
- Wardour Castle. Wiltshire, United Kingdom
- Blackfriars, Gloucester, United Kingdom
- Kingswood Abbey, Gloucestershire, United Kingdom
- Tattershall College, Lincolnshire, United Kingdom
- Mount Grace Priory, Yorkshire, United Kingdom
- Beeston Castle, Cheshire, United Kingdom
- Prudhoe Castle, Northumberland, United Kingdom
- Sherborne Abbey, Dorset, United Kingdom

== Selected publications ==
- Historic Landscape of The Weld Estate Dorset, (Editor), 1987
- William Barnes: the Somerset engravings, co-authored with Charlotte Lindgren, 1989
- Beeston Castle, Cheshire: A report on the excavations 1968–1985, co-authored with Peter Hough, 1993
- "Almost the richest city": Bristol in the Middle Ages, (Editor), 1997
- Windsor: medieval archaeology, art and architecture of the Thames Valley, co-authored with Eileen Scarff, 2002
