= Harold Carlton =

British writer

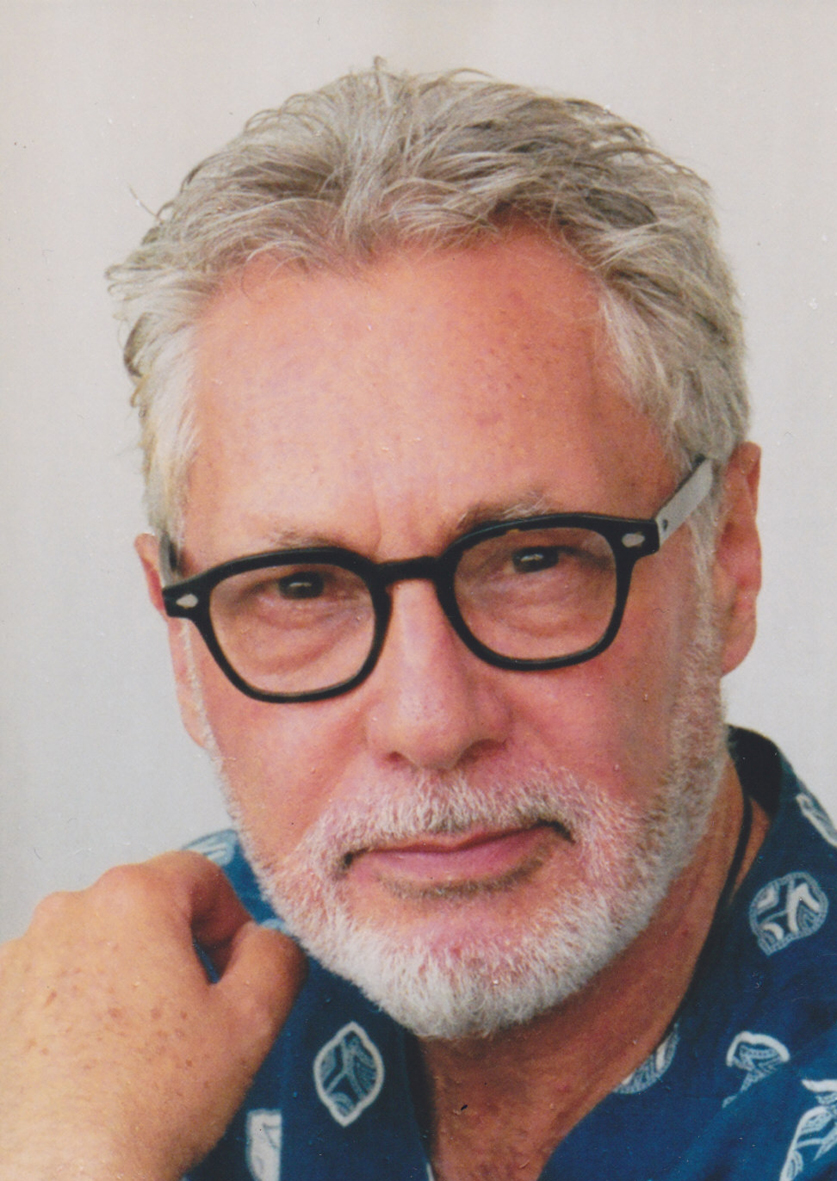
Writer and journalist Harold Carlton

Harold Carlton is a British writer.

== Early life and education ==
Carlton was born in Reading, Berkshire, England, moving to London within a year. His formal education ended when he left Kilburn Grammar School to enroll in London’s Saint Martin’s School of Art for a Design course.

During the third year of fashion design, he was holidaying in Paris (making the rounds with his design folio) when he was hired on the spot as assistant designer at Nina Ricci’s maison de couture. He stayed there a year before joining Andre Courrèges, who had just left Balenciaga to set up his own small house in Paris.

After two years with Courrèges, he attempted to join Hubert de Givenchy, but that designer advised him to be an illustrator. Carlton began illustrating articles for ELLE Magazine, becoming a freelance artist for The London Sunday Times, The Daily Mail, The Observer, The New York Times, Mademoiselle Magazine and many other publications.

== Writing career ==
He moved to New York, where he began writing freelance articles for The Village Voice and McCalls, often centered on fashion, social issues or the media. After two years in New York, he returned to London to become Men's Wear Editor of The Sunday Times and a regular contributor to the Magazine with articles on Donyale Luna and the Houston Astrodome.

Ernest Hecht of Souvenir Press commissioned a “fashion novel”, preferably centred on Carnaby Street. The Rag Dolls (1968) was the first of four novels published in UK and United States which Carlton wrote under the pen-name Simon Cooper.

He used his real name on a novel for the first time for the 1988 novel Labels, (Bantam Books) which sold over a million copies in USA, and was translated into many languages, including Hebrew. It has been published three separate times in the UK.

His first non-fiction book, The Scarf, a history of the silk scarf, followed. (Stuart Tabori Chang 1989).

Sacrifice, another novel for Bantam Books, was published in 1991.

His childhood memoir about an eccentric family: The Handsomest Sons In the World, (Duckworth, 2001), was one of the London Sunday Times “100 Best Books” of that year, one of six in the biography category.

He returned to fiction with Heaven, Hell & Mademoiselle (Orion, 2010) a novel of the 1968 Paris fashion world where ‘Mademoiselle’ is Coco Chanel herself. The following year, 2011, Orion Books re-published Labels, now itself labelled as “a cult classic”.

== Bibliography ==
=== Fiction ===
==== Under the pen-name Simon Cooper ====
- The Rag Dolls (1968)
- The Pretty Boys (1970)
- Exhibition (1974)
- The Dirt Sandwich (1980)
- Big Girls Don’t Cry (1981)

==== As Harold Carlton ====
- Labels, (1988)
- Sacrifice (1991)
- Heaven, Hell and Mademoiselle (2010)

=== Non-fiction ===
- The Scarf (1989)
- The Handsomest Sons In the World (2001) (published as Marrying Out by Slightly Foxed Editions in 2014)
