= Alfred Carlton =

Australian cricketer

Personal information
- Born: 13 November 1867; Bacchus Marsh, Australia
- Died: 10 September 1941 (aged 73); Melbourne, Australia

Domestic team information
- Years: Team
- 1893-1901: Victoria
- Source: Cricinfo, 26 July 2015

Alfred Carlton (13 November 1867 – 10 September 1941) was an Australian cricketer. He played three first-class cricket matches for Victoria between 1893 and 1901. He also played for Karrakatta Cricket Club, Carlton Cricket Club, and North Melbourne Cricket Club

== See also ==
- List of Victoria first-class cricketers
