= Winslow Carlton =

- Born: 1907
- Died: December 6, 1994
- Education: Harvard College
- Occupation: Businessman
- Children: Mary G. Swope, Ann W. Carlton, Rhona Carlton-Foss

Winslow Carlton (1907 – December 6, 1994) was an American businessman and organizer of cooperatives.

After graduating from Harvard University in 1929, Carlton began work with the Federal Relief Administration, where he worked with self-help cooperatives in California. In this context he was assigned by the Roosevelt administration to lead a successful project to determine whether it was feasible to develop an alternative mutual self-help economy, in part based on barter, to the conventional economy in which many people were homeless and starving in spite of having skills and being ready to work. In 1935, Carlton married Margaret Gillies, the national director of the Self-Help Cooperative Service. Upton Sinclair used Carlton as the model for his protagonist in his 1936 novel, Co-op: a Novel of Living Together. As in many historical novels, some of the motives attributed by the author to the protagonist were not those of the real person, a source of frustration for Carlton.

In 1938, Carlton founded Group Health Insurance, the first community based, non-profit insurance plan in the US. Later, it expanded to include the first dental insurance plan and the first mental health insurance plan. He later founded Health Insurance Plan of New York City, a non-profit insurance plan for city employees, the first health maintenance organization {HMO} in the eastern United States, and second in the United States as a whole. In the political domain, Carlton worked on Medicare/Medicaid legislation with Senator Jacob Javitz.

Carlton was a founding partner with Alfred Winslow Jones in AW Jones, the first hedge fund. Modern hedge funds are based on different principles to this early fund, but they use the same term to describe themselves as organizations. AW Jones at the time was based on the economic principles of "hedging" one's financial commitments with countervailing commitments in a way that led to optimized expected profit.

Carlton was on the board of Henry Street Settlement House internal Henry Street Settlement in New York City from 1931, was president, chairman of the board and director until 1978. He was the founder and chairman in New York of Mobilization for Youth, which became a national model for anti-poverty programs for the inner city.

Carlton was also a founder in Washington, D.C., of the Foundation for Cooperative Housing (FCH) which established cooperatives so that lower income working people could afford homes of their own. With the help of Congress, FCH established a revolving fund that covered the capital costs of establishing housing. People who were selected joined a cooperative that owned the housing, paying their costs of membership over time. This proved to be a particularly successful model because co-op members were highly motivated to succeed in their lives once they had a homestead to protect and build upon, and because the approach cost the government nothing once the revolving fund had been established.

In the final decade of his life, Carlton co-founded and was president of Selcore Labs, where a new a-cellular pertussis vaccine was developed and approved by the U.S. Food and Drug Administration. With its name changed to North American Vaccine Company (NAVAC), the company went public and was later acquired by Baxter.

Carlton died of cancer at his home in Woods Hole, Massachusetts, on December 6, 1994.
