= Clark Thomas Carlton =

American novelist

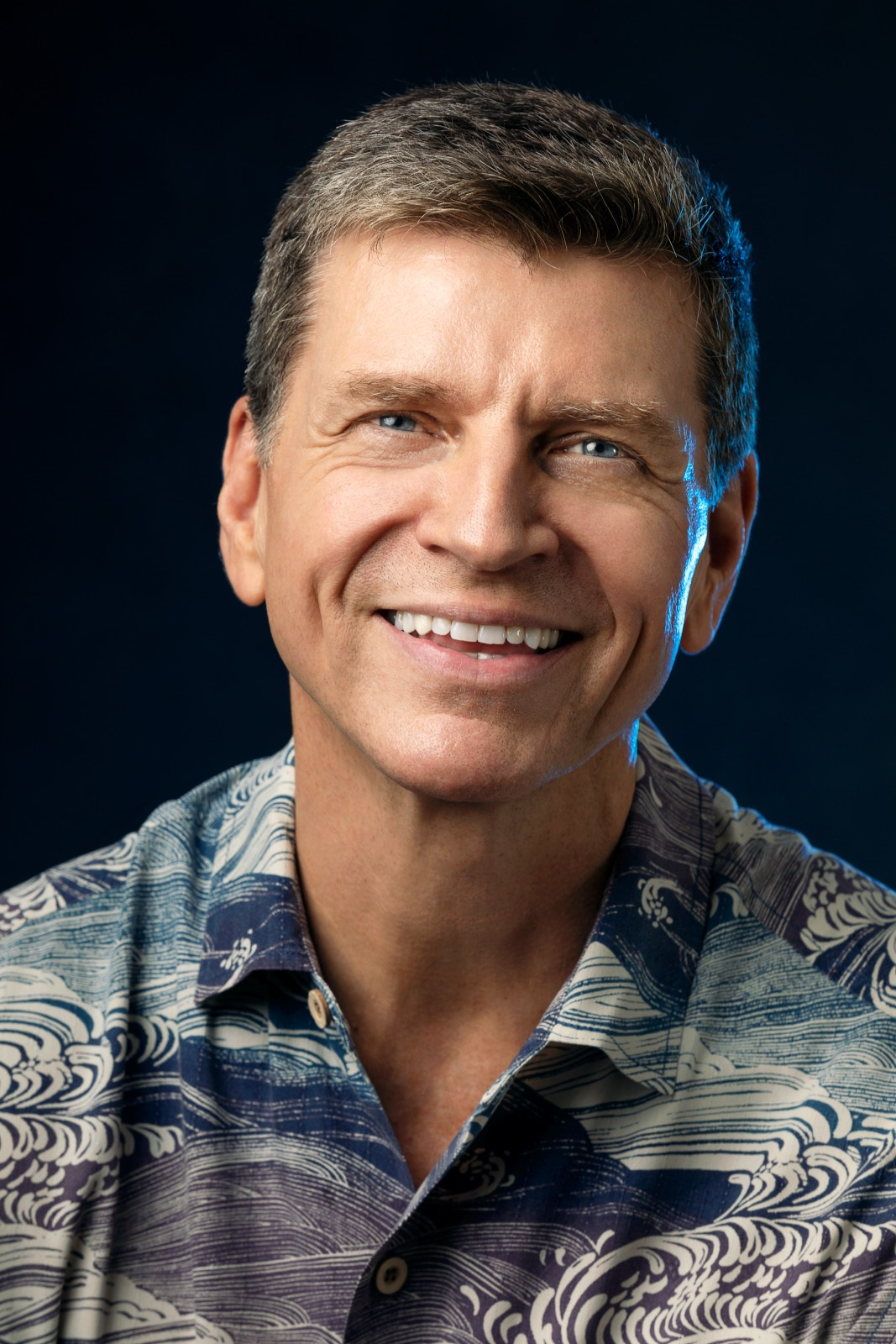
- Born: Clark Thomas Carlton; Gainesville, Florida, U.S.
- Education: University of California, Los Angeles
- Occupations: Author; screenwriter; playwright; songwriter
- Writing career
- Language: English
- Genres: Science fiction Fantasy
- Notable works: Prophets of the Ghost Ants; The Prophet of the Termite God
- Notable awards: Kirkus Best of the Year 2011, Drama-Logue Critics Award 1997
- Website: clarkthomascarlton.com

Clark Thomas Carlton is an American novelist, playwright, and a screen and television writer living in Los Angeles. He has also worked as a producer of reality television. Carlton is best known for his science fiction/fantasy novel Prophets of the Ghost Ants published by HarperCollins Voyager in 2016.

== Author ==
Carlton is the author of Prophets of the Ghost Ants, Book 1 of the Antasy Series published by HarperCollins Voyage on December 13, 2016. The indie version of the book was named a Best of 2011 by Kirkus Reviews. The sequel, Book 2 of the Antasy Series is The Prophet of the Termite God which was released on April 13, 2019.

== Playwright ==
In 1997, Carlton was awarded the Drama-Logue Critics Award for his play Self Help or the Tower of Psychobabble along with playwrights Neil Simon and Henry Ong. The play, a satire of the psychotherapy industry, was performed in Santa Monica, Palm Springs, Los Angeles and West Hollywood and directed by Michael Kearns and was also produced in Chicago.

== Painter ==
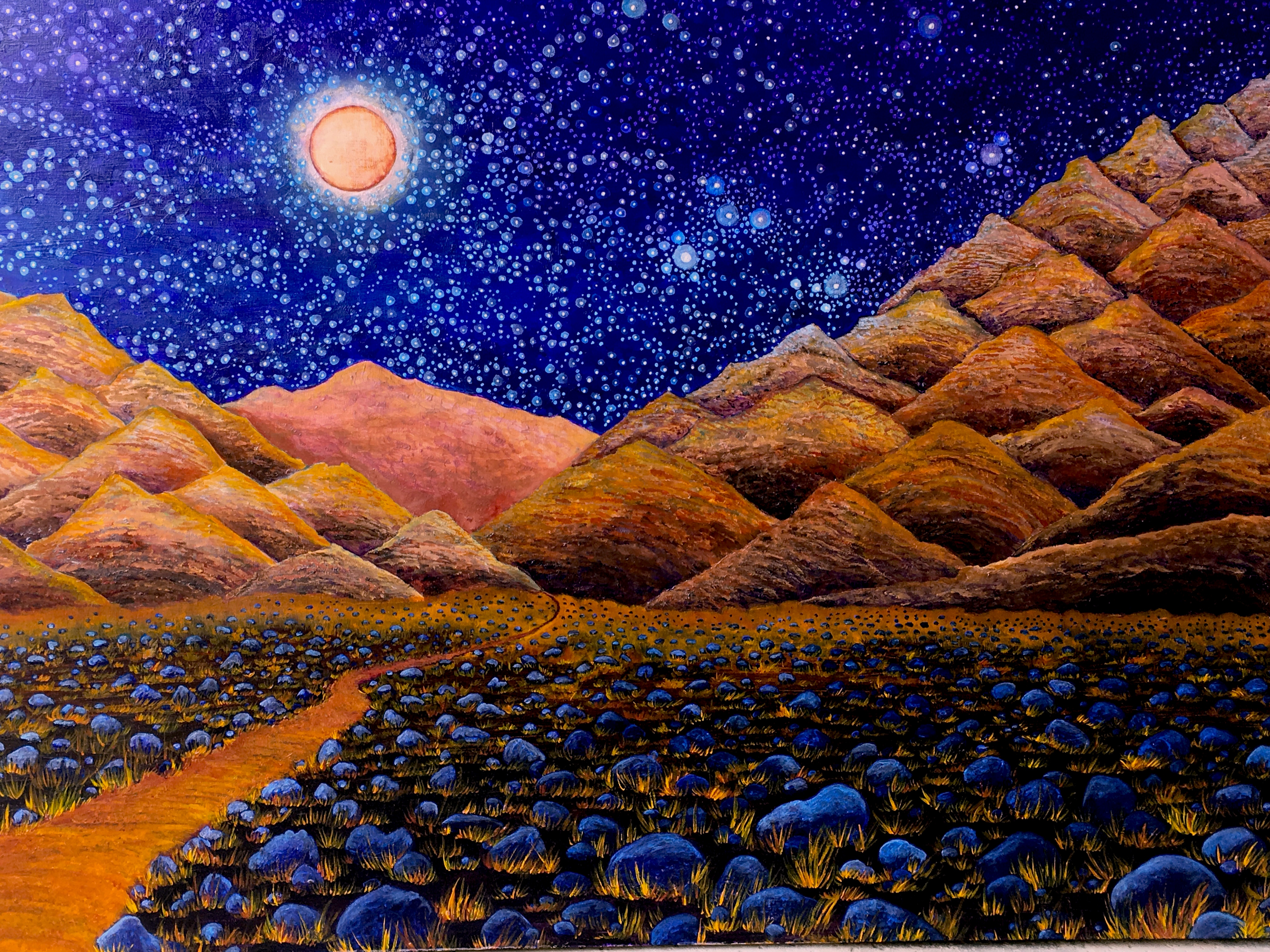
Further Glories, a painting by Clark Thomas Carlton inspired by a view of the San Jacinto mountains of Palm Springs at night.

Carlton is a painter who embraces the description of his work as "Grandma Moses on acid". His work has been displayed through the Palm Springs Art Museum Annex through the Palm Springs Arts Council.

== Musician, singer-songwriter ==
In December 1999, Carlton released an album of songs titled Salt Water through CD baby where he accompanied himself on acoustic guitar. At present he is at work on Gardens of Babylon, a synth pop opera about the building of the Hanging Gardens of Babylon. The opera was written with his partner, Mike Dobson, an Emmy award winning music supervisor and composer on the daytime drama, the Young and the Restless.
