= Paul K. Carlton =

United States Air Force general

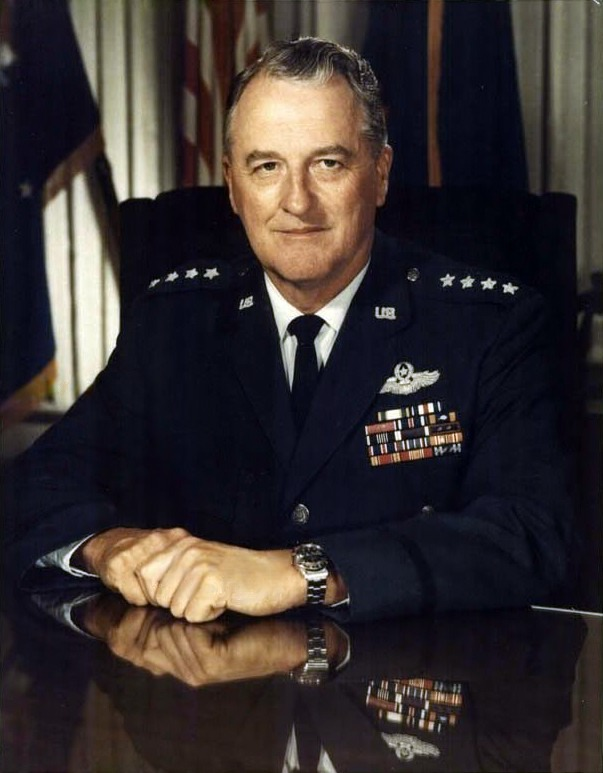
- Official color portrait at Norton Air Force Base, 1973.
- Born: April 14, 1921; Manchester, New Hampshire
- Died: November 23, 2009 (aged 88); San Antonio, Texas
- Relatives: Paul K. Carlton, Jr. (son)
- Military career
- Allegiance: United States of America
- Branch: United States Air Force
- Service years: 1942–1977
- Rank: General
- Commands: Military Airlift Command
- Conflicts: World War II
- Awards: Silver Star; Legion of Merit (2); Distinguished Flying Cross; Air Medal (6); Purple Heart

Paul Kendall Carlton (April 14, 1921 – November 23, 2009), also known as P. K. Carlton, was a United States Air Force general. He was commander in chief of the Military Airlift Command, with headquarters at Scott Air Force Base, Illinois.

== Biography ==
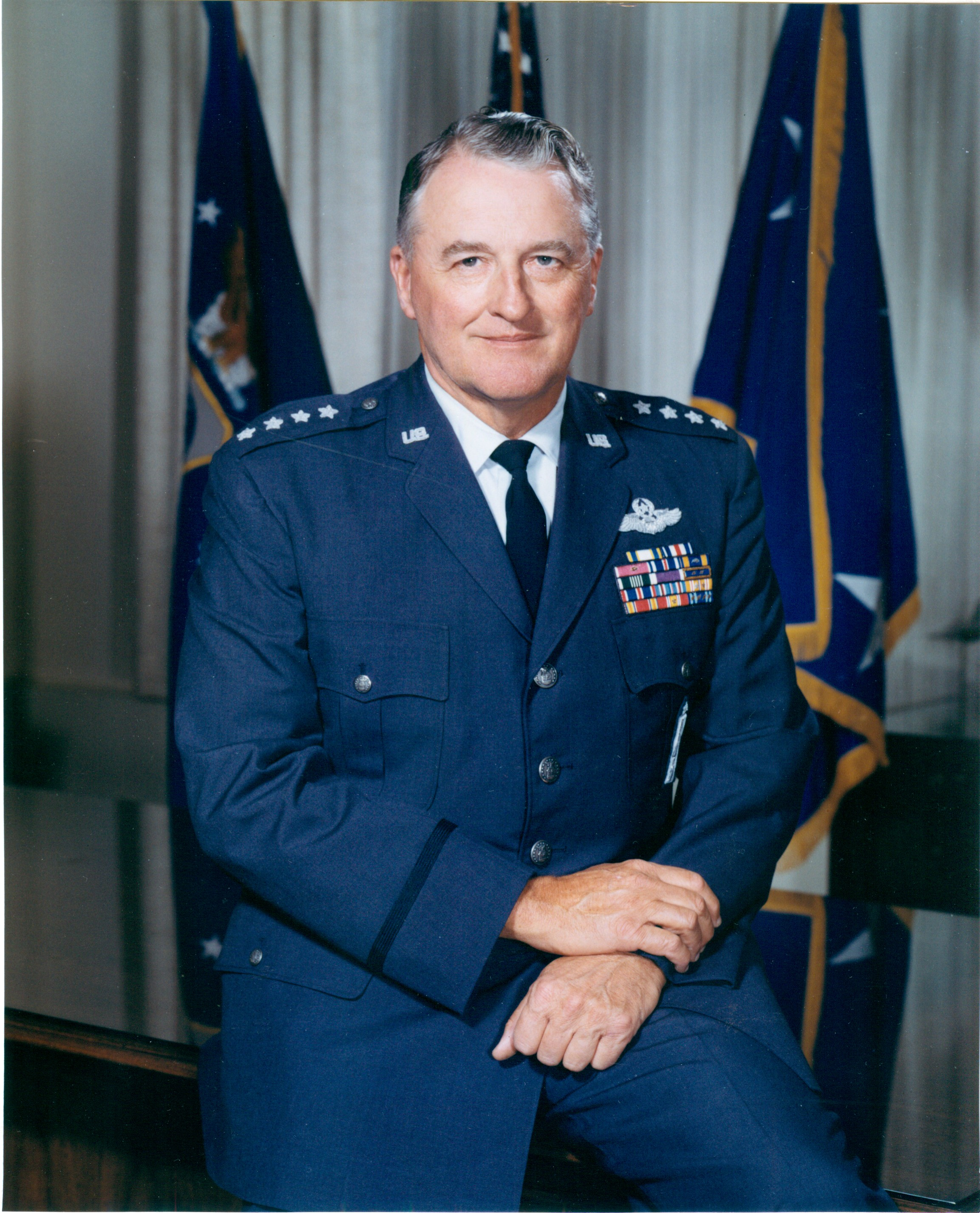
Alternate portrait of General Paul K. Carlton

Carlton was born in Manchester, New Hampshire, on April 14, 1921, and grew up in Erie, Pennsylvania, where he graduated from Academy High School in 1939. He attended the University of Pittsburgh and Ohio University, and in September 1941 entered the Army Air Corps aviation cadet program. He received his pilot wings and commission as a second lieutenant in April 1942 at Albany Army Airfield, Georgia.

Carlton was a B-17 Flying Fortress instructor pilot with Air Training Command until 1944. He then flew B-29 aircraft with the first group operating against the Japanese mainland from India and China, accumulating a total of 350 combat hours.

Following World War II, from January 1946 to September 1949, he was assigned to Strategic Air Command's first atomic bomb organization, the 509th Bombardment Wing, Roswell Air Force Base, New Mexico. This was followed by a four-year assignment as aide-de-camp to SAC Commander in Chief General Curtis E. LeMay.

From October 1953 to January 1956, Carlton was assigned to March Air Force Base, California, as director of operations, 320th Bombardment Wing, and later as director of plans, 15th Air Force. He went to Guam in January 1956 and became director of operations for SAC's 3d Air Division at Andersen Air Force Base. He returned to the United States in November 1957 and served the next one and a half years as deputy commander of the 93d Bombardment Wing and the Combat Crew Training School for B-52 and KC-135 aircrews at Castle Air Force Base, California. He assumed command of the 4126th Strategic Wing, Beale Air Force Base, California, in May 1959.

Carlton was selected to attend the National War College in Washington, D.C., from August 1961 to June 1962, during which time he also attended The George Washington University. In June 1962 Carlton assumed command of the 379th Bombardment Wing at Wurtsmith Air Force Base, Michigan, and in November 1963, was assigned as commander of the 305th Bombardment Wing, Bunker Hill Air Force Base, Indiana.

In July 1965, Carlton was assigned to SAC headquarters at Offutt Air Force Base, Nebraska, with dual responsibilities as chief of Single Integrated Operational Plans Division, Joint Strategic Target Planning Staff, and chief of Operations Plans Division, Directorate of operations. He assumed duties as assistant deputy chief of staff for operations in June 1967.

Carlton assumed command of the 1st Strategic Aerospace Division, Vandenberg Air Force Base, California, in August 1968. He returned to Headquarters SAC in March 1969 to serve as deputy chief of staff for operations. He next served as commander of the 15th Air Force, with headquarters at March Air Force Base, California, from August 1969 until September 1972, when he assumed command of the Military Airlift Command. On February 1, 1977, when MAC was designated as a specified command, Carlton became CINCMAC. He retired from the Air Force March 31, 1977.

While serving as commander, achievements by Military Airlift Command people resulted in award of the 1972 Benjamin D. Foulois Flying Safety Trophy; the 1973 Harmon International Trophy for the 1972 nonstop HC-130 flight from Ching Chuan Kang Air Base, Taiwan, to Scott Air Force Base, Illinois; the 1974 Mackay Trophy, for the prisoner of war release, Operation Homecoming; the 1974 David C. Schilling Award and the 1974 Harmon International Trophy, both for the American airlift to Israel, in which MAC C-141s and C-5 Galaxies moved 22,395 tons 6,500 miles by air to Israel in 33 days; and a special Humanitarian Award from Milwaukee's Trans-Aire '75 Exposition for MAC's many humanitarian achievements, including the airlift of Vietnamese and Cambodian orphans to their new homes in the United States and the massive airlift evacuation of Vietnamese refugees. Carlton also received the 1975 Reserve Officers Association's Minuteman Hall of Fame Award.

A command pilot, Carlton has more than 12,000 flying hours and has flown the B-47, B-52, including the "H" model, supersonic B-58 Hustler, KC-135, C-141, C-5 and the Mach 3 plus SR-71 strategic reconnaissance aircraft. He is a member of the Air Force Association (Citation of Honor, 1973), Order of Daedalians, American Defense Preparedness Association, and the National Defense Transportation Association.

The Senate confirmed his presidential nomination to the grade of general October 9, 1972. He died in 2009.

== Awards and decorations ==
His military decorations and awards include the Air Force Distinguished Service Medal, Silver Star, Legion of Merit with oak leaf cluster, Distinguished Flying Cross, Purple Heart, Air Medal with five oak leaf clusters, and the Army Commendation Medal.

- Air Force Distinguished Service Medal
- Silver Star
- Legion of Merit with oak leaf cluster
- Distinguished Flying Cross
- Purple Heart
- Air Medal with five oak leaf clusters
- Army Commendation Medal

== Effective dates of promotion ==
Insignia	Rank	Date
	General	October 9, 1972
	Lieutenant general	August 1, 1969
	Major general	November 1, 1967
	Brigadier general	June 1, 1965
	Colonel	May 8, 1953
	Lieutenant colonel	February 20, 1951
	Major	July 15, 1945
	Captain	June 1, 1944
	First lieutenant	January 16, 1943
	Second lieutenant	April 29, 1942
