= Neely C. Carlton =

American politician

Member of the Mississippi State Senate from the 22nd district
- In office January 2, 1996 – January 6, 2004
- Preceded by: Hainon A. Miller
- Succeeded by: Eugene Clarke

Personal details
- Born: July 13, 1970 (age 56) Greenville, Mississippi, U.S.
- Party: Democratic
- Spouse(s): David Maatallah; Doug Lyons
- Children: 3
- Parent: Frank Carlton (father)
- Education: University of Southern Mississippi; University of Mississippi Law School
- Occupation: Lawyer

Neely Carlton Lyons (born Neely C. Carlton on July 13, 1970) is an American attorney and Democratic politician. She represented the 22nd District in the Mississippi State Senate from 1996 to 2004.

== Biography ==
Neely C. Carlton was born on July 13, 1970, in Greenville, Mississippi. Her parents were Frank Carlton, who served in the Mississippi House of Representatives from 1963 to 1972, and his wife Frances (Caillouet) Carlton. Frank's maternal aunt and Neely's great-aunt, Zelma Wells Price, was also a member of the House, representing Washington County from 1944 to 1956. Neely graduated from the University of Southern Mississippi and then the University of Mississippi School of Law. Carlton became an attorney, working with the Lake Tindall, LLP firm in Greenville by 2002. By 1999, she was a member of the Washington County Bar Association and the Mississippi Bar Association. In 2000, Carlton was selected as one of the Top 50 Business Women of the Delta.

=== Political career ===
On November 7, 1995, Carlton defeated Republican Harper M. Young in an election to the Mississippi State Senate. Carlton was elected to represent the Senate's 22nd district, comprising Bolivar, Sharkey, and Washington counties, for the 1996-2000 term. Aged only 25 at her first inauguration, Carlton was the youngest member of the Mississippi State Senate. During this term, Carlton served as Vice Chair of the Senate's Conservation and Water Resources Committee. In November 1999, Carlton won re-election for the 2000-2004 term in the Senate. During this term, Carlton was the Vice Chair of the Judiciary Committee and the Chair of the Interstate & Federal Cooperation Committee. She was known to be active in the area of sex offender registration. At the end of her second term, Carlton indicated a desire to retire from the Senate in order to focus on her family and her law practice. In 2003, the Mississippi Legislature passed a resolution to "commend [her] legacy of public service".

Three years after leaving the Senate, Carlton began to work for Mississippi Governor Haley Barbour. She then worked as the Chief of Staff of the Mississippi Department of Public Safety. In September 2014, Carlton began working for the Butler Snow law firm focusing on government relations and regulations.

== Personal life ==
Carlton is a Baptist. She was a member of the Pi Beta Phi sorority. She was previously married to David Maatallah, and they had a daughter born in January, 2003, making Carlton the first-ever Mississippi state senator to give birth while in office. Carlton and Maatallah then had twin sons, born in May, 2005 /> Before 2017, Carlton married Doug Lyons.
