= Paul K. Carlton Jr. =

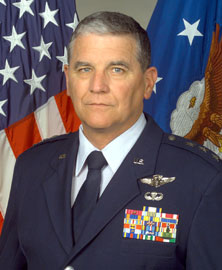
- Lieutenant General (Dr.) Paul K. Carlton Jr.
- Born: May 13, 1947 (age 79); Roswell, New Mexico
- Relatives: General Paul K. Carlton (father)
- Military career
- Allegiance: United States of America
- Branch: United States Air Force
- Service years: 1969–2002
- Rank: Lieutenant General
- Commands: Surgeon General of the Air Force
- Awards: Distinguished Service Medal (2); Legion of Merit (2); Airman's Medal; Air Medal

Lieutenant General (Dr.) Paul Kendall Carlton Jr. (born May 13, 1947) is a retired United States Air Force lieutenant general who last served as the 17th Surgeon General of the United States Air Force, Headquarters U.S. Air Force, Bolling Air Force Base, D.C.

General Carlton was commissioned after being honored a distinguished graduate of the United States Air Force Academy in 1969. He is a fellow and former Air Force governor of the American College of Surgeons. He was named a consultant in general surgery to the Air Force surgeon general in 1981. He conceptualized and implemented the first Air Force rapid-response surgical team in Europe—the flying ambulance surgical trauma team. He remains an active surgeon having performed more than 4,000 operations as principal surgeon and 6,000 as first assistant. He has published extensively in medical literature.

An active flier, General Carlton holds Federal Aviation Administration commercial, instrument, multi-engine, glider and instructor ratings. During Operation Desert Storm, he commanded the 1702nd Air Refueling Wing Contingency Hospital, completing 32 combat support missions and 140 combat flying hours in the C-21, C-130, KC-10 and KC-135. He retired from the Air Force December 1, 2002.

After retiring from the Air Force, General Carlton was named Director of the Homeland Security Initiative for the Texas A&M Health Science Center to address homeland security issues related to human health.

General Carlton is the managing member of PK Concepts, LLC.

== Education ==
- 1969 Bachelor of Science degree, U.S. Air Force Academy, Colorado Springs, Colorado
- 1973 Doctor of Medicine, University of Colorado at Denver

== Assignments ==
- September 1969 – May 1973, medical student, University of Colorado, Denver
- July 1973 – June 1978, resident, general surgery, Wilford Hall USAF Medical Center, Lackland Air Force Base, Texas
- June 1978 – April 1979, staff surgeon, Royal Air Force Lakenheath, England
- April 1979 – May 1982, Chief, General Surgery, USAF Hospital, Luke Air Force Base, Arizona
- May 1982 – August 1985, Chairman, Department of Surgery, USAF Regional Medical Center, Wiesbaden Air Base, West Germany
- August 1985 – May 1988, Commander, USAF Hospital, Torrejon Air Base, Spain
- May 1988 – August 1991, Commander, USAF Medical Center, Scott Air Force Base, Illinois (October 1990 – March 1991, Commander, 1702nd Air Refueling Wing Contingency Hospital, Southwest Asia)
- August 1991 – September 1994, Director, Medical Services and Training, Headquarters Air Education and Training Command, Randolph Air Force Base, Texas
- September 1994 – May 1999, Commander, 59th Medical Wing, Wilford Hall USAF Medical Center, Lackland Air Force Base, Texas
- May 1999 – November 1999, Commander and Director, Air Force Medical Operations Agency, Office of the Surgeon General, Bolling Air Force Base, D.C.
- December 1999 – October 2002, The Surgeon General of the Air Force, Headquarters U.S. Air Force, the Pentagon, Bolling Air Force Base, D.C.

== Major awards and decoration ==
=== Airman's Medal ===
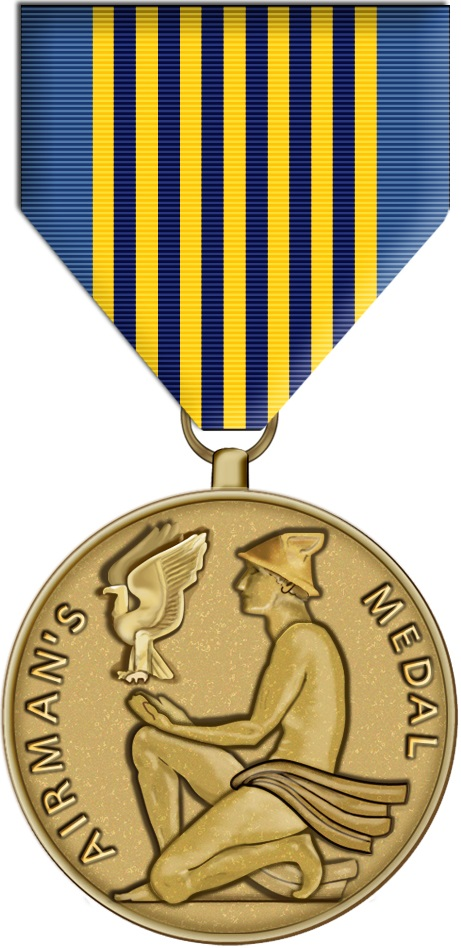

Citation:

Lieutenant General Paul K. Carlton, Jr. distinguished himself by heroism involving voluntary risk of life at the Pentagon, Washington, District of Columbia on 11 September 2001. On that date, an American Airlines 757 with 67 passengers originating at Dulles Airport crashed into the Pentagon near the heliport. The approximate number of casualties at point of impact was 190. General Carlton was in the Pentagon at the time of the crash. Knowing that there would be numerous casualties, he proceeded to Corridor 4, C ring. General Carlton entered a room filled with chest high debris. Although half the room was engulfed in flames and smoke filled, General Carlton and several other rescuers located a trapped victim who was stuck under some fallen debris. The men could see the trapped victim but could not quite reach the man. One of the rescuers cleared the debris while General Carlton tried to pull the victim free. He then placed a water-soaked tee shirt on the victim's face to aid his breathing. The victim was roused, and realizing the imminent danger they were all facing, rolled to his left far enough for General Carlton to grab him. They were then able to move the victim to safety. All the while, the room continued to rain fire and debris on General Carlton and the others. As the fire intensified and moved closer in the room, General Carlton continued to sweep the room for other victims. There was a loud noise; the flaming ceiling began to fall and one of the rescuers shouted for all to leave the area. As the metal caging in the ceiling gave way, General Carlton helped the others to escape the burning room. The exemplary courage and heroism displayed by General Carlton reflect great credit upon himself and the United States Air Force.

=== Commendations ===
Lt Gen Carlton has been awarded the following:

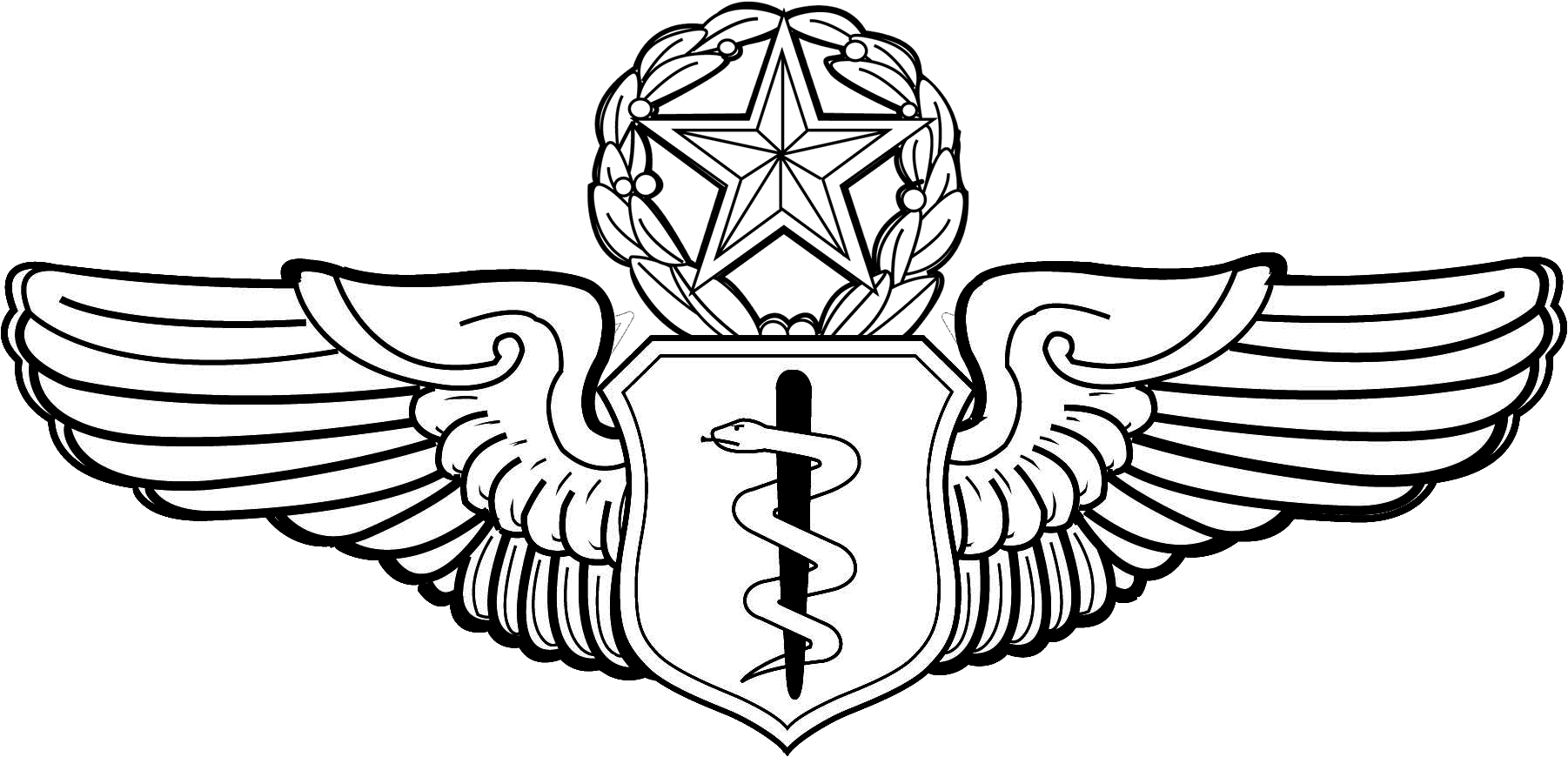

| Badge | Air Force Command Flight Surgeon Badge | | |
| Badge | Basic Parachutist Badge | | |
| 1st row | Air Force Distinguished Service Medal with 1 bronze Oak leaf cluster | | Legion of Merit with 1 bronze Oak leaf cluster |
| 2nd row | Airman's Medal | Meritorious Service Medal | Air Medal |
| 3rd row | Air Force Commendation Medal | Air Force Presidential Unit Citation | Air Force Joint Meritorious Unit Award |
| 4th row | Air Force Outstanding Unit Award with 3 bronze Oak leaf clusters | Air Force Organizational Excellence Award with 1 bronze Oak leaf cluster | National Defense Service Medal with 2 Service stars |
| 5th row | Armed Forces Expeditionary Medal | Southwest Asia Service Medal with 2 bronze Campaign stars | Global War on Terrorism Service Medal |
| 6th row | Air Force Overseas Long Tour Service Ribbon with 2 bronze Oak leaf clusters | Air Force Longevity Service Award with 1 silver and 2 bronze Oak leaf clusters (7 awards) | Small Arms Expert Marksmanship Ribbon |
| 7th row | Air Force Training Ribbon | Kuwait Liberation Medal (Saudi Arabia) (Saudi Arabia) | Kuwait Liberation Medal (Kuwait) |
| Badge | Headquarters Air Force Badge | | |

== Effective dates of promotion ==
Dates of Rank
| Insignia | Rank | Date |
|---|---|---|
| | Second Lieutenant | June 4, 1969 |
| | First Lieutenant | December 4, 1970 |
| | Captain | June 4, 1972 |
| | Major | June 4, 1975 |
| | Lieutenant Colonel | June 4, 1980 |
| | Colonel | October 1, 1985 |
| | Brigadier General | October 1, 1991 |
| | Major General | May 25, 1995 |
| | Lieutenant General | December 1, 1999 |

| Preceded by Michael K. Wyrick (acting) | Surgeon General of the United States Air Force; 1999–2002 | Succeeded by George P. Taylor |
