= Phil Carlton (footballer) =

Australian rules footballer

Personal information
- Full name: Phil Carlton
- Born: 8 March 1953 (age 73)
- Original team: West Coburg
- Height: 194 cm (6 ft 4 in)
- Weight: 90 kg (198 lb)

Playing career^{1}
Years	Club	Games (Goals)
1975	South Melbourne	10 (2)
- ^{1} Playing statistics correct to the end of 1975.

Phil Carlton (born 8 March 1953) is a former Australian rules footballer who played with South Melbourne in the Victorian Football League (VFL).
