= Frank Carlton (politician) =

American politician (1935–2009)

Member of the Mississippi House of Representatives
- In office 1963 – January 1972 Serving with (1968-1972); Douglas Abraham; Sonny Merideth; Hainon A. Miller; C. B. Newman

Personal details
- Born: February 12, 1935 Los Angeles, California, U.S.
- Died: March 8, 2009 (aged 74)
- Party: Democratic
- Spouse: Frances Caillouet
- Children: 3, including Neely
- Education: University of Southern Mississippi; University of Mississippi

Colonel Frank Anderson Carlton, Jr. (February 12, 1935 – March 8, 2009) was an American lawyer and Democratic politician. He served as a member of the Mississippi House of Representatives from 1963 to 1972.

== Life and career ==
Carlton was born in Los Angeles, California, the son of Frank Anderson Carlton Sr. and Hazel (Wells) Carlton. He lived with his maternal aunt, Zelma Wells Price, who represented Washington County in the Mississippi House of Representatives from 1944 to 1956. As a teenager, Carlton worked in the Mississippi Legislature Post Office. He graduated from the Jefferson Military College high school as class valedictorian. He attended the University of Southern Mississippi on a scholarship from the Golden Gloves amateur boxing organization. Also at USM, he became a commissioned officer in the U.S. Army through Reserve Officers' Training Corps, and remained active in military service until retirement in 1984. Carlton was the president of the student body his senior year and named USM's Outstanding Male Graduate of 1957. After graduating, Carlton entered the University of Mississippi School of Law, where he dropped out a semester early in an unsuccessful run for the Mississippi House of Representatives, but returned and graduated in 1960. Carlton then moved to Greenville, Mississippi, where he opened a law practice.

Carlton served in the Mississippi House of Representatives from 1963 to 1972. From 1968 to 1972, he represented the 17th District, which comprised Washington, Sharkey, and Issaquena Counties. From 1971 to 1975, he was an Assistant District Attorney for Washington County, Mississippi, under District Attorney George Everett. From 1980 to his retirement in 2004, Carlton was the District Attorney for Mississippi's 4th Circuit Court District.

== Personal life and death ==
Carlton married Frances Caillouet in 1961 in Greenville, Mississippi. They had three children. Their daughter, Neely C. Carlton, served in the Mississippi State Senate from 1996 to 2004.

Carlton died on March 8, 2009, at the age of 74.
