= J. Phil Carlton =

American judge

J. Phil Carlton (born January 14, 1938) is an American judge.

== Life ==
Carlton was born in Rocky Mount, North Carolina. He attended South Edgecombe High School in Pinetops, North Carolina, where he was student body president. Carlton received his bachelor's degree in economics from North Carolina State College in 1960. In 1959-60 he was an assistant campaign manager in the gubernatorial campaign of Terry Sanford. He received his J.D. from University of North Carolina at Chapel Hill in 1963. He practiced law in Tarboro, NC from 1963 to 1968 and was administrative assistant to Federal Judge L. Richardson Preyer in Greensboro, NC in 1964.

In 1968, he was elected district court judge for the 7th Judicial District of North Carolina and appointed chief judge by Chief Justice R. Hunt Parker. He was reelected in 3 general elections to 4 year terms. He served in that position until 1977 when Gov. Jim Hunt appointed Carlton as the first Secretary for the North Carolina Department of Crime Control. In 1979, he was appointed by Governor Jim Hunt to the NC Court of Appeals. He was then elected to the North Carolina Supreme Court and was an associate justice until February, 1983 when he resigned to return to the private practice of law.

In 1983, he was a founding partner in the North Carolina law firm of Poyner & Spruill until 1994 and practiced in the Raleigh, NC office. During these years and until he retired in 2012 he was chief executive officer of State Capital Law Firm Group, (now SCGLEGAL, one of the largest international law firm associations. According to the group's website, "he and 17 former state governors formed the organization in 1989 when he was a partner at North Carolina member firm Poyner & Spruill LLP. He was elected as State Capital Group's first chairman in 1989 and served in that capacity until 1993, when he became CEO."

Carlton was the chief negotiator for the Tobacco Master Settlement Agreement in the 1990s.

Carlton was chairman for the Board of Trustees at North Carolina Wesleyan College. He received its Honorary Doctor of Laws degree in 1979.
