= Castell Dinas Brân =

Castle in Denbighshire, Wales

- Near Llangollen, Denbighshire, in Wales
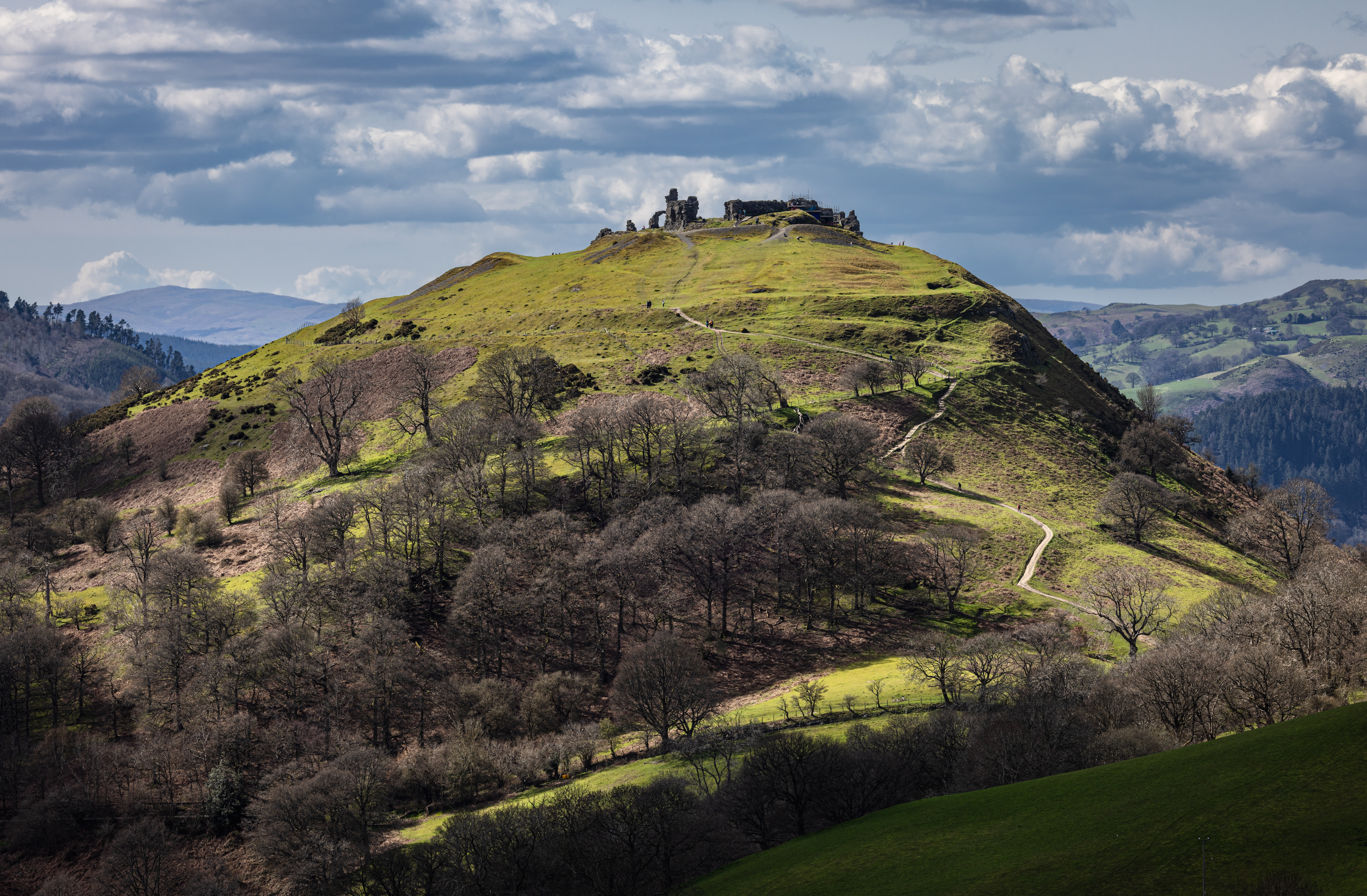
- The castle on top of its hill.

Site information
- Owner: Denbighshire County Council
- Open to the public: All year
- Condition: Ruinous

Location
- Location within Denbighshire
- Coordinates: 52.97922°N 3.15957°W
- Grid reference: SJ 2224 4306

Site history
- Built: 13th century
- Materials: Stone
- Fate: Abandoned in the 14th century
- Events: Conquest of Wales

Castell Dinas Brân is a medieval castle, built by the Princes of Powys Fadog, which occupies a prominent hilltop site above the town of Llangollen in Denbighshire, Wales. The presently visible stone castle was probably built in the 1260s by Gruffydd Maelor II, a prince of Powys Fadog, on the site of several earlier structures, including an Iron Age hillfort.

Dinas Brân has been variously translated as the "crow's fortress" or "fortress of Brân", with Brân as the name of an individual or of a nearby stream. An English name, "Crow Castle", has also been used since at least the 18th century.

== Name ==
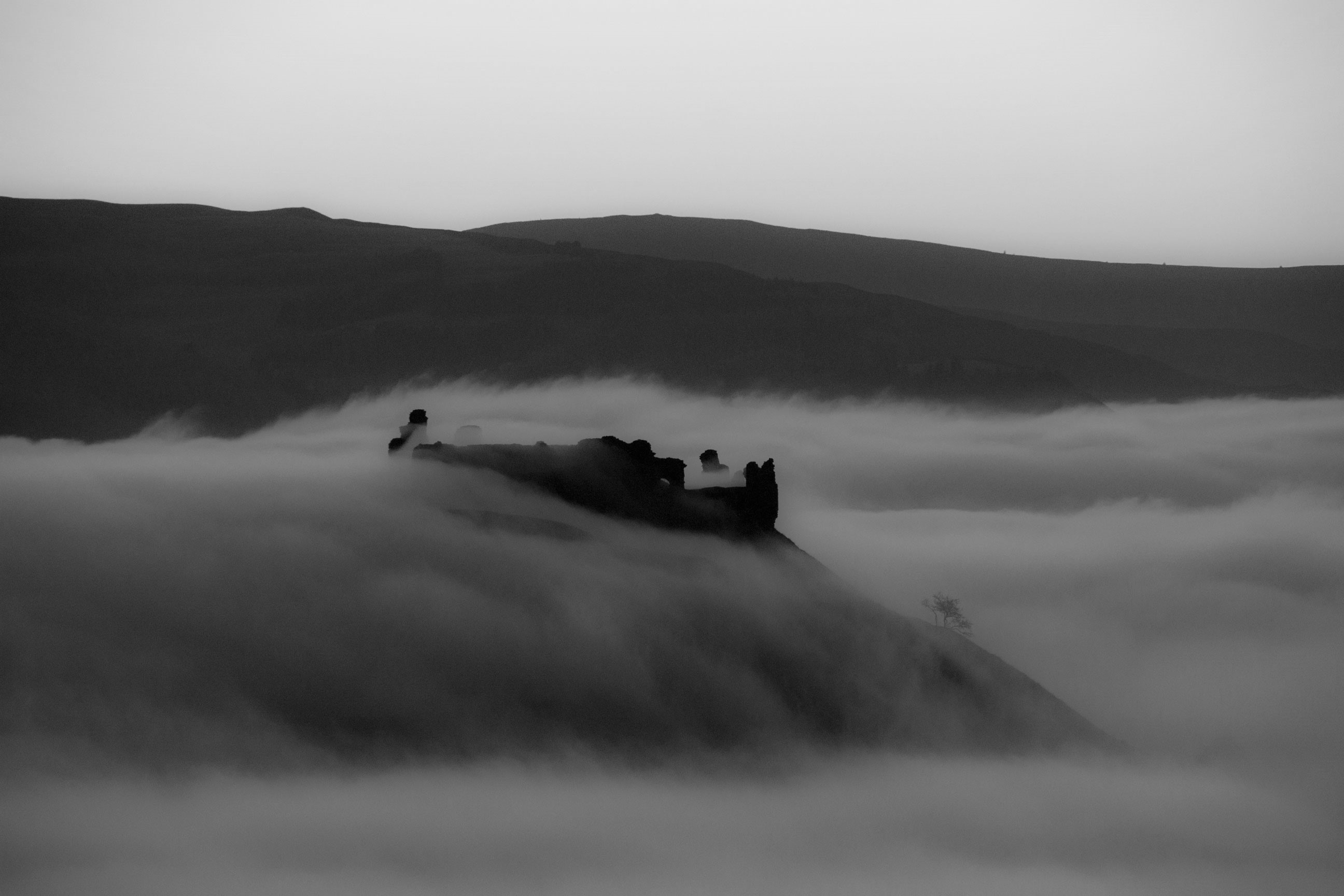
Looking westwards from Dinas Brân towards the Eglwyseg.

The name Dinas Brân has been debated since at least the 17th century. In modern times it is sometimes incorrectly translated as the City of Crows: the word dinas, "city" in modern Welsh, in Middle Welsh signifies a defended enclosure, while brân is the Welsh for "crow", singular, (plural: brain), suggesting a meaning "the crow's fortress".

An alternative theory is that Brân is a personal name. Humphrey Llwyd and William Camden both suggested it came from that of a Gaulish chieftain, "Brennus". There is a legend which says that Brân was a Cornish prince, the son of the Duke of Cornwall, while another suggests Brân could be named for King Brân Fendigaid (the Blessed) also called Bendigeidfran, a British King of probable historicity whose exaggerated biography appears in The Mabinogion. Camden also suggested the name was simply derived from the word bryn, "hill".

A further suggestion is that Brân simply refers to a mountain stream of the same name which originated in the Eglwyseg Rocks and ran at the northern foot of the hill, a suggestion made by Thomas Pennant amongst others. The 17th-century scholar Edward Lhuyd, in Adversaria, confirmed that to his knowledge the name Brân came from "the brook of this name by Lhangollen". As with several other streams in Wales, the word Brân was applied to the brook apparently due to the black colour of its water.

The castle is known in English as "Crow Castle". This form of the name has been used since at least the 18th century, having been recorded in Gough's edition of William Camden's Britannia. By the mid-19th century this was the form of the name said to be used by most of the inhabitants of Llangollen, where there was an inn of the same name.

== History ==
=== Iron Age ===
During the British Iron Age, around 600BCE, a large hillfort was built on the summit of what was to become Dinas Brân by a Celtic tribe named the Ordovices. An earthen rampart - probably with a wooden palisade - surrounded a number of roundhouses and an extra deep ditch was cut to defend the gentler slopes on the southern side of the hill. This was one of many strongholds belonging to the Ordovices in this part of North Wales.

In the west are Craig Rhiwarth in the Berwyn Range and Dinas Emrys near Beddgelert in Gwynedd. In the east are Castell Dinas Brân itself, Caer Drewyn, Caer Euni and Moel y Gaer near the Horseshoe Pass. The inhabitants of Old Oswestry hillfort were either from the tribes of the Ordovices or Cornovii and Iron Age hillforts in the Clwydian Range to the north (including Foel Fenlli and Moel Arthur) were occupied by the neighbouring Deceangli. The Ordovices were also neighboured to the north-west by the Gangani, to the east by the Cornovii, to the south by the Silures and south-west by the Demetae.

In 1879 the pioneering English geologist Charles Lapworth named the Ordovician geological period after the Ordovices as the rock formations he had studied were located in the tribe's former North Welsh domain.

- Lapworth wrote (op. cit., pp. 13 – 14): "North Wales itself – at all events the whole of the great Bala district where Sedgwick first worked out the physical succession among the rocks of the intermediate or so-called Upper Cambrian or Lower Silurian system; and in all probability much of the Shelve and the Caradoc area, whence Murchison first published its distinctive fossils – lay within the territory of the Ordovices; ... Here, then, have we the hint for the appropriate title for the central system of the Lower Palaeozoics. It should be called the Ordovician System, after this old British tribe."

=== Post-Roman Britain ===
The earliest structure that might have been built at Dinas Brân is believed to have belonged to Elisedd ap Gwylog during the 8th century. Elisedd, who was a Romano British ruler during the Anglo-Saxon settlement of Britain is named on the Pillar of Eliseg and is considered one of the founders of the Kingdom of Powys, however, no archaeological evidence for any structure from this period has been found.

=== Late medieval period ===
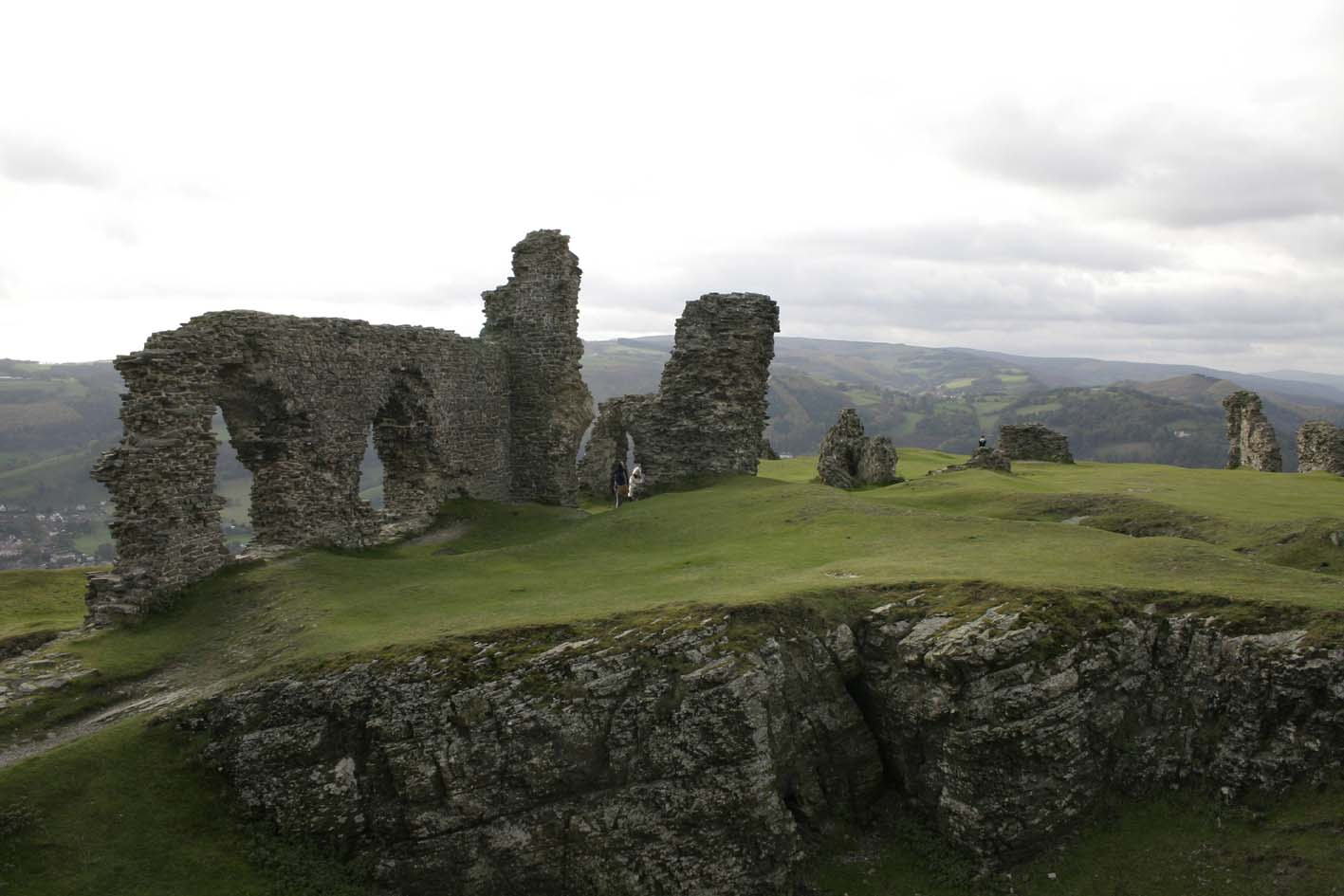
The inner bailey at Dinas Brân

Dinas Brân may have been a fortification in the Kingdom of Powys. When its last Prince, Gruffydd Maelor, died in 1191, his kingdom was divided into Powys Fadog in the north and Powys Wenwynwyn in the south. His son, Madog ap Gruffydd Maelor, the lord of Powys Fadog, who founded Valle Crucis Abbey at Llantysilio in 1201 might have ruled from Dinas Brân. Whatever structure existed at this site, it would have been a wooden fortification probably consisting of a wooden palisade surrounding a hall and other buildings. Early records attest to this early castle being destroyed by fire.

Following the destruction of the wooden castle, Gruffydd II ap Madog, Lord of Dinas Bran, the son of Madog ap Gruffydd Maelor, rebuilt Dinas Brân in stone sometime in the 1260s. At the time Gruffydd II ap Madog was an ally of Prince Llywelyn ap Gruffudd Prince of Wales, with Powys acting as a buffer state between Llywelyn's heartland of Gwynedd and England. Dinas Brân was one of several castles being built following the signing of the Treaty of Montgomery which had secured Wales for Llywelyn, free from English interference. The castle at Dolforwyn Castle near Newtown, which was ordered to be built by Llywelyn around the same time, has some similarities to Dinas Brân and may have been the work of the same master mason. When Gruffudd died in 1269 or 1270, the castle was inherited by his four sons. Madoc the eldest son was senior but each of the sons may have had apartments at Dinas Brân.

The peace between Llywelyn and Edward I did not last long. In 1277 Edward launched the Conquest of North Wales from Chester. Two of Gruffudd's sons, Llywelyn and Madoc, quickly made peace with Edward. However, their surrender documents state the need to recapture Dinas Brân proving that the fortification was not under Madoc's control. Henry de Lacy, Earl of Lincoln was sent with forces from Oswestry to capture Dinas Brân. As soon as he had arrived he was told that the defenders of the castle, probably the younger brothers Owain and Gruffudd - who were still allies of Llywelyn Prince of Wales, had abandoned the castle and set it alight. The reason for this action is not clear but it may be that they had no confidence that they could defend the castle so did not want to let it fall intact to the English or their elder brother. Despite the fire, the castle was not badly damaged. The Earl of Lincoln recommended to Edward that the castle be repaired and garrisoned. The castle was occupied by the English till at least the Treaty of Aberconwy when Llywelyn sued for peace and ordered some repair work be undertaken.

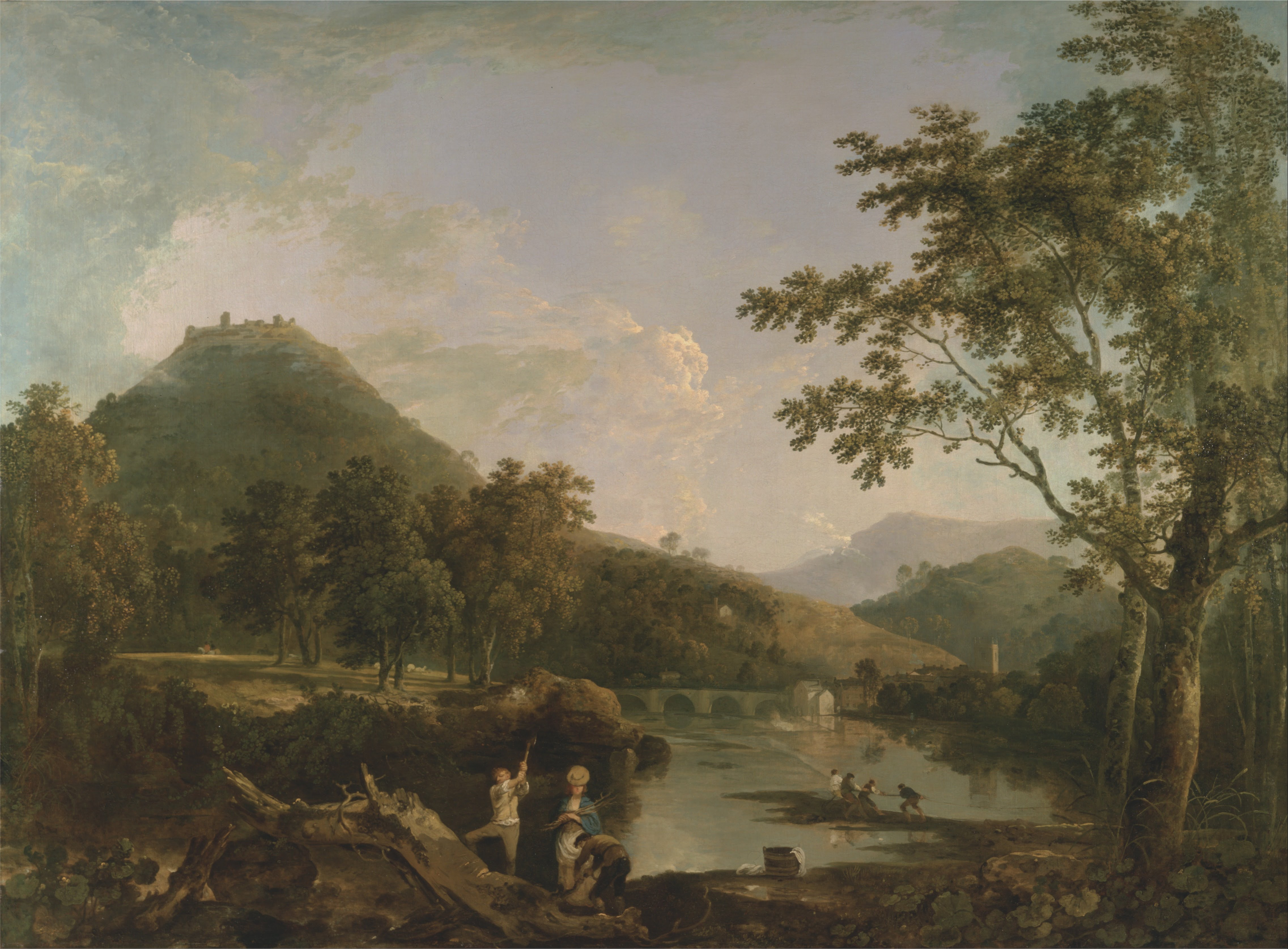
Dinas Bran from Llangollen by Richard Wilson, 1771

When the war restarted in 1282, the history of the castle is not recorded. It may have been recaptured by the Welsh like many other castles in the early months of the war, but ultimately it fell to the English. After Madoc died: the three surviving brothers all fought for Llywelyn. Following the end of the war in October 1282 and the death of Llywelyn, most of Powys Fadog including the castle was granted to John de Warenne, Earl of Surrey. Rather than rebuild Dinas Brân, De Warenne choose instead to build a new castle by the River Dee at Holt on the Flintshire-Cheshire border. Dinas Brân was left to fall into ruin.

=== Later history ===
2017 geophysical surveys at Castell Dinas Brân

Castell Dinas Brân has also been a source of inspiration for artists in more recent centuries, such as J. M. W. Turner and Richard Wilson, both of whom strove to capture the castle and its surroundings through their paintings.

The first archaeological investigation at the castle was carried out in 2017. The Castle Studies Trust funded Denbighshire County Council to carry out geophysical surveys at the site, encompassing the medieval and Iron Age features. As part of a larger project in the Dee Valley funded by the National Lottery Heritage Fund, the Clwyd-Powys Archaeological Trust (CPAT) conducted a condition survey in 2020 to inform conservation work. This was followed by a CPAT-led excavation in 2021 focusing on the area in and around the gatehouse.

== Layout ==
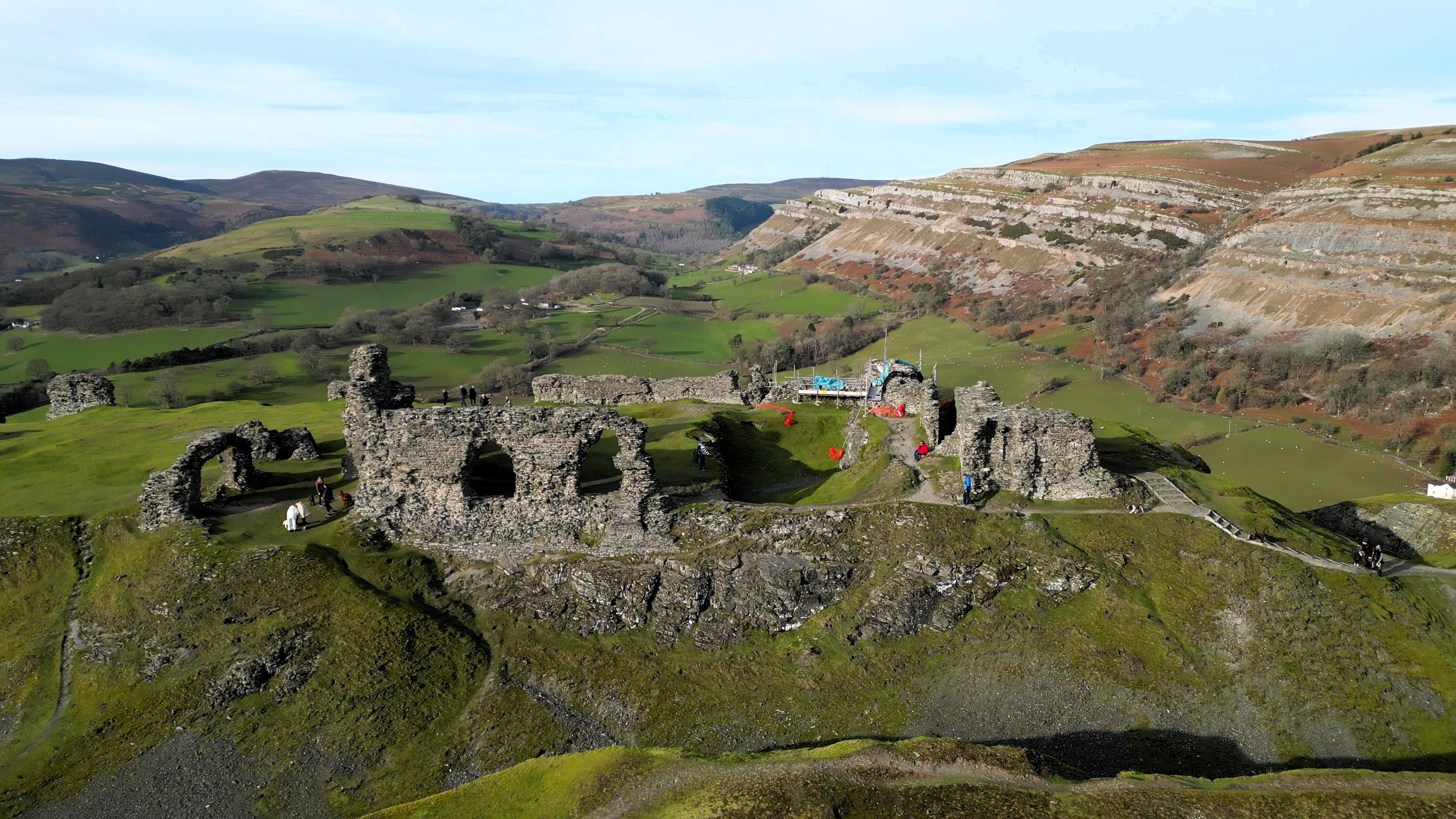
Dinas Brân southern wall and deep rock cut ditch

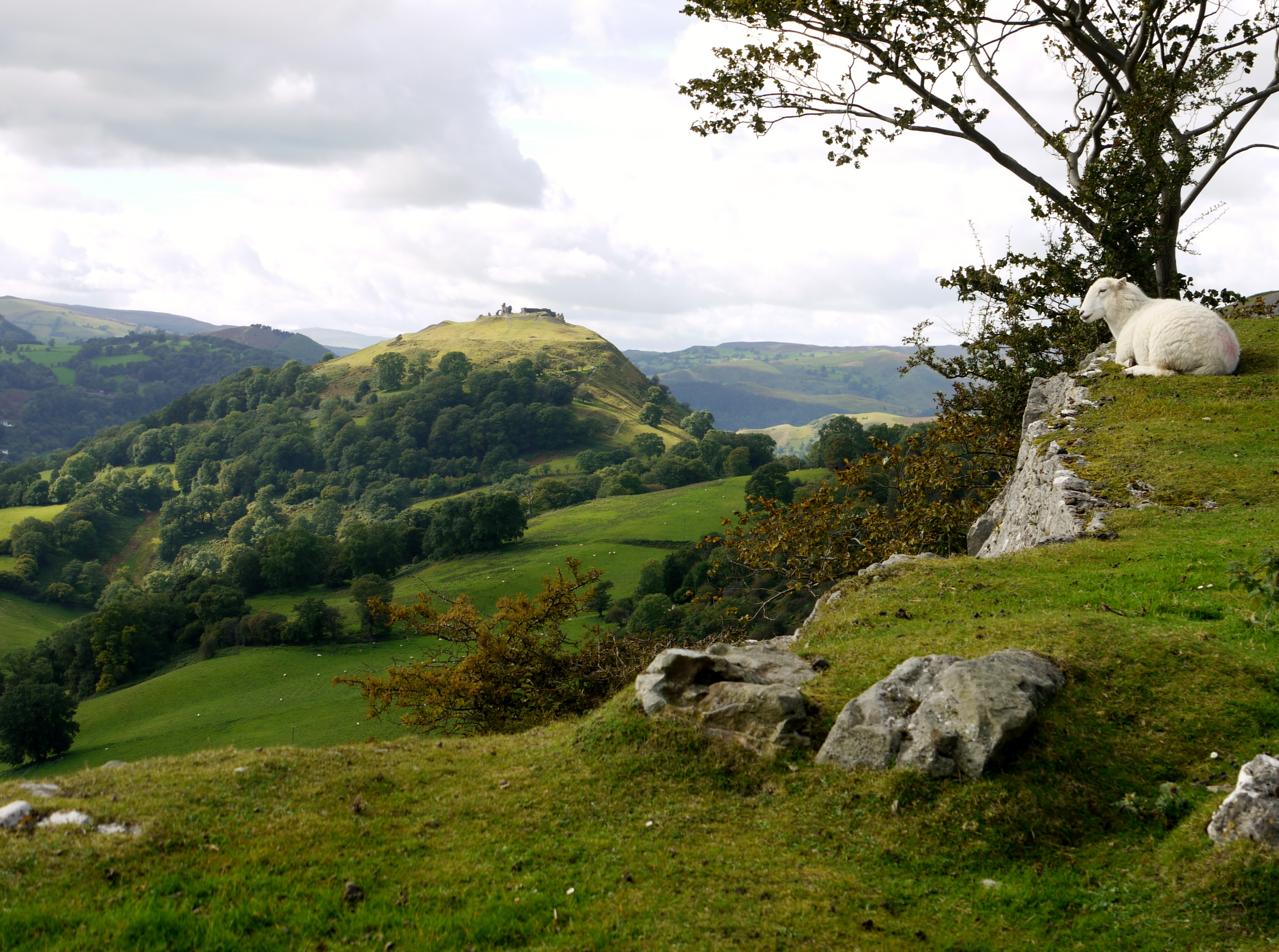
Castell Dinas Bran viewed from the panorama walk

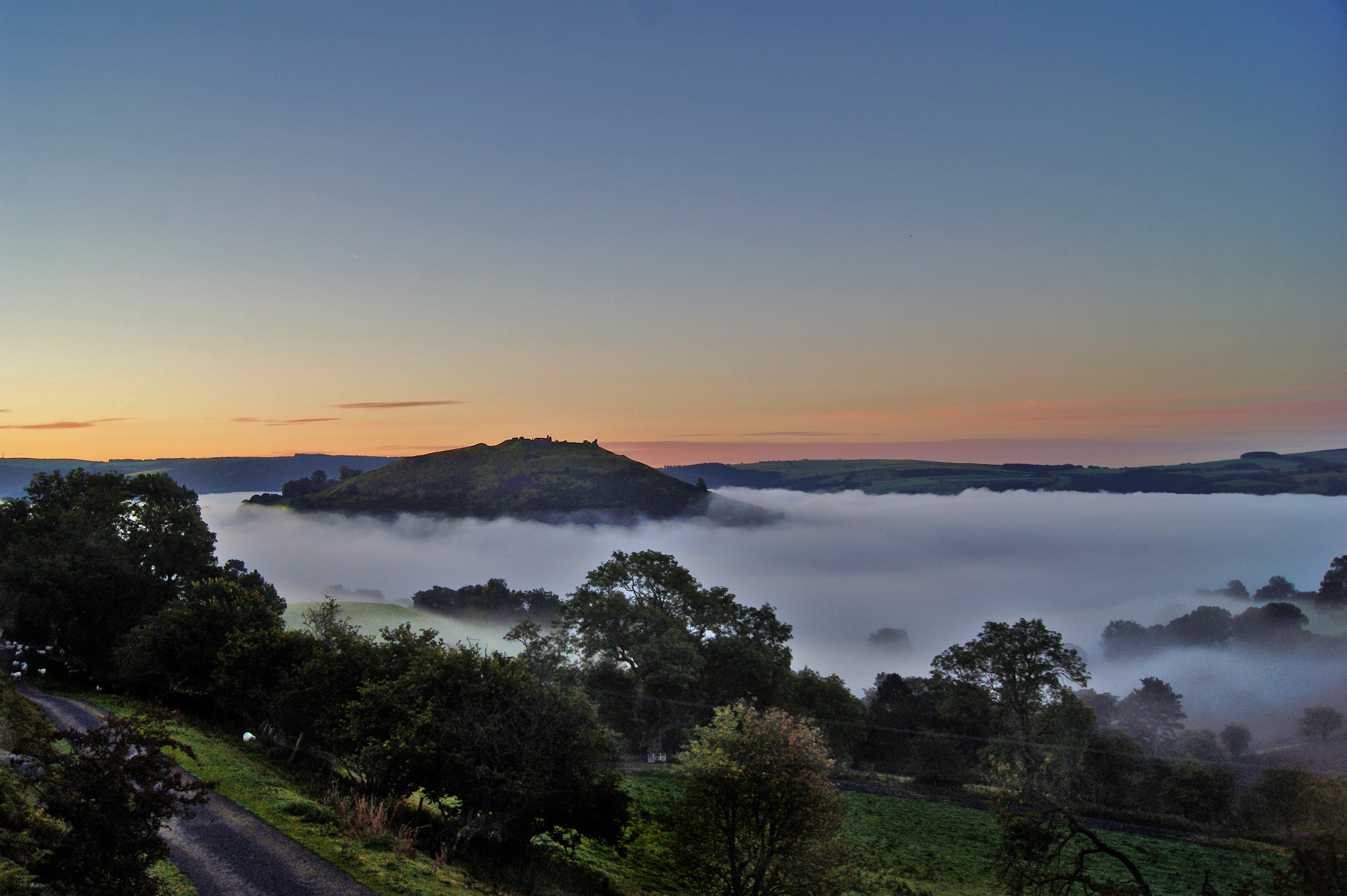
Clouds over the valley, with the castle on the left

Dinas Brân has rectangular stone defensive walls with the longer sides running in an east-west direction. The northern wall is defended with the steep natural slope that falls sharply downwards for several hundred feet. The walls on the gentler slopes on the southern and eastern sides are strengthened with an additional 20 feet (6.1 m) deep rock-cut ditch and counterscarp bank.

At the south-eastern corner where the ditch is at its deepest stood the keep, which looks out onto a relatively easy approach to the castle from the River Dee. The two-storey structure would have been the strongest part of the castle, with its own defended approach through a narrow passage. Adjacent to the keep at the north eastern corner is a gatehouse, which was originally approached by a wooden bridge spanning the ditch. There is however almost no evidence remaining of the bridge and its supporting structure so that the exact configuration remains unclear. The bridge was also overlooked by the keep which allowed archers stationed there to guard the entrance. The gatehouse had two towers either side of a decorated covered passageway into the castle courtyard.

The Great Hall is sited on the castle's southern side, where some of the more visible remains still stand. This was a large room used for dining and receiving visitors. Its much enlarged windows still look south across the valley and an arched gateway leads from the west end of the room to what was once the Kitchens in the basement of the adjacent apsidal (D-shaped) tower. This tower, called the Welsh Tower, is a typical feature of Welsh castles of the period. It would have protruded from the castle wall into the defensive ditch and provided archers with a clear view of any attackers attempting to approach the southern wall. The tower had perhaps three storeys with living quarters on the upper floors. In the south western corner was a postern gate. This was an additional exit from the castle, designed to be used in times of siege to allow the garrison to 'sally' out and attack their besiegers. Fragments of the arch remain as well as the slot for the door's drawbar.

Originally, in the enclosed area of the castle there would have been stables, workshops, storage buildings and maybe a chapel but as these were built of wood nothing remains above ground level.

In the 19th century there was a local tradition, recorded by Walter Hawken Tregellas, that at Tower Farm, about a mile from the castle, had formerly stood a tower that was an outwork of the castle defences.

== Legends and literature ==
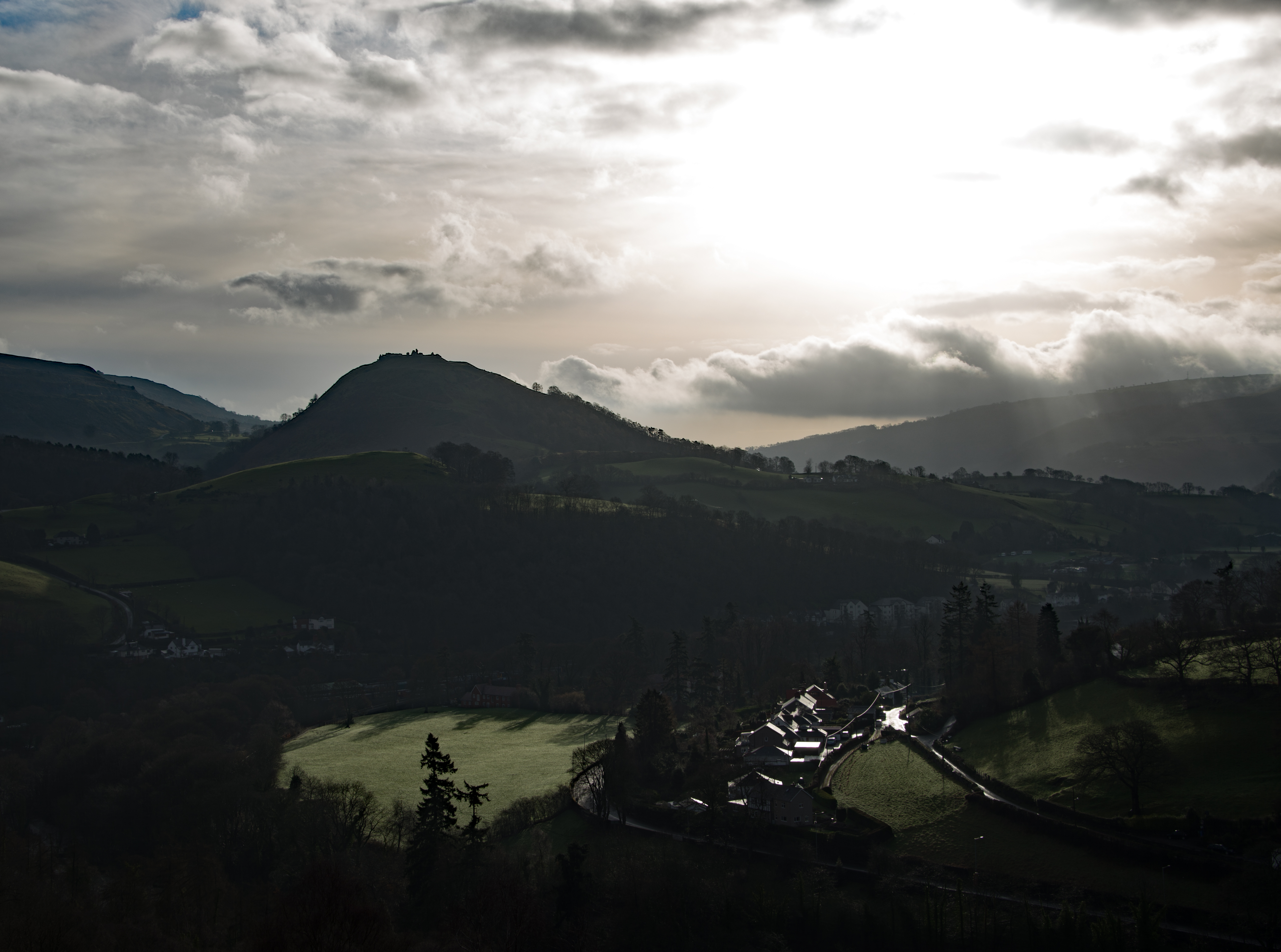
Castell Dinas Brân viewed from the north west

Whilst the historical record for Dinas Brân is sparse, there are many myths and legends associated with the ancient site.

The popular Welsh song 'Myfanwy' was composed by Joseph Parry and first published in 1875. Parry wrote the music to lyrics written by Richard Davies ('Mynyddog'; 1833–77). The lyrics were probably inspired by the fourteenth-century love-story of Myfanwy Fychan of Castell Dinas Brân, and the poet Hywel ab Einion. That story was also the subject of the popular poem, 'Myfanwy Fychan' (1858), by John Ceiriog Hughes (1832–87) and of Felicia Hemans's poem 'Howel's Song', set to music by John Parry in his 'Welsh Melodies' (1822).

The castle's first literary appearance is in a 13th-century romance entitled Fouke le Fitz Waryn, or The Romance of Fulk Fitzwarine. In this tale the castle, named "Chastiel Bran," is referred to as a ruin during the early years of the Norman Conquest. The tale continues to tell of an arrogant Norman knight, Payn Peveril, who hears that no one has had courage enough to stay overnight inside the castle ruins, for fear of evil spirits. Payn and 15 'knightly followers' determine to stay the night. A storm blows up and an evil, mace-wielding giant called Gogmagog, appears. Payn defends his men against the attacks of the giant with his shield and cross, then stabs Gogmagog with his sword. As the giant is dying he tells of the earlier bravery of King Brân who had built the castle to try to defeat the giant. Despite King Brân's attempts against Gogmagog the King had been forced to flee and since then the giant had terrorised all the land around for many years. The giant also tells of a great treasury of idols buried at Dinas Brân which includes swans, peacocks, horses and a huge golden ox but dies without revealing its location.

== Preservation ==
The castle is a scheduled ancient monument owned and maintained by Denbighshire County Council with the assistance of Cadw. It is open all year round for visitors. Due to the exposed steep routes up to the castle, official advice suggests stout walking shoes and warm, waterproof clothing.

== Geology ==
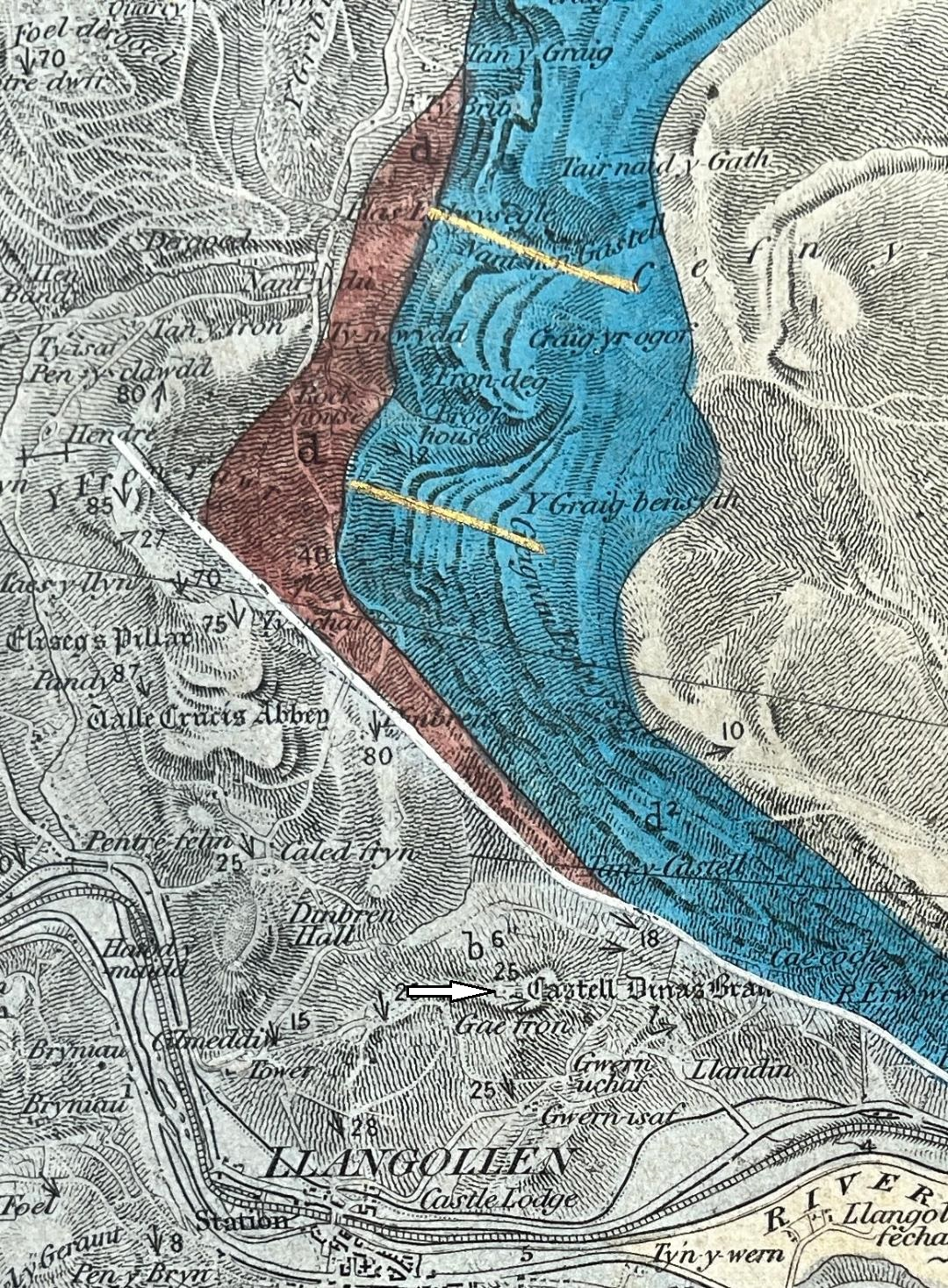
1895 Geological Map of area around Castell Dinas Brân. West to east: Mauve = Silurian; Brown = Carboniferous 'Basement Beds'; Blue = Clwyd Limestone Group; Beige = Millstone Grit (Namurian - Lowest stage of the Upper Carboniferous). White line = Fault; Gold line = Lode. Dinas Brân arrowed.

The conspicuous hill upon which Dinas Brân was built reaches an elevation of 321.4m / 1054 ft Amsl and is composed of thinly bedded, uncleaved, late Silurian deep water marine silty mudstones of the Dinas Brân Geological Formation (formerly the Dinas Brân Group or Dinas Brân Beds). At up to 225m in thickness, the Dinas Brân Formation is thought to range upwards in age into the late Ludfordian Stage, the upper of two chronostratigraphic subdivisions within the Ludlow epoch (427.4 ± 0.5 million years to 423.0 ± 2.3 million years ago in duration).

Geographically, the mudstones and siltstones extend from the type exposures around Dinas Brân to the Pontcysyllte Aqueduct about 4.1 miles (6.6 km) to the east. The formation occupies the core of the Llangollen syncline and, although the basal junction is not seen, it overlies the Vivod Group (or Monograptus leintwardinensis Beds) of Wills and Smith (1922) which also consist of thinly bedded flaggy mudstones.

Upper junction of the Dinas Brân Formation is likewise not exposed, but opposite the (Llangollen - Panorama Walk) Wern road T-junction at the base of the Eglwyseg Escarpment is a very small outcrop of dark olive-grey mudstone with abundant remains of the brachiopod Dayia navicula (J. de C. Sowerby, 1839). According to the Old Series One-Inch Geological Map, published 1895, this exposure is faulted against fossiliferous Lower Carboniferous Limestone of the Clwyd Limestone Group, deposited between 363 and 325 million years ago and forming the impressive escarpment, but once again the actual junction is obscured by a combination of scree, regolith and common gorse (Ulex europaeus). However, The Clwyd Limestone Group also rests locally upon so-called 'Basement Beds' and elsewhere with marked Unconformity on deformed Silurian and older rocks.

Silurian fossils can also be observed in scree and rubble below the castle on the steep northern slope and in the deep rock-cut ditches partially surrounding the ruin, which served the dual purpose of both defense and quarrying stone to build Dinas Brân. Orthocone straight-shelled Nautiloids (Molluscan Class Cephalopoda), various brachiopod species and rare Trilobite remains may be found.

== See also ==
- List of hillforts in Wales
- List of castles in Wales

== Notes ==
Citations

Bibliography

- Camden, William, Gough, Richard (ed.), Britannia, vol. iii
- Evans, John (1804), Letters written during a tour through North Wales in the year 1798
- Jones, Nigel (2020). Castell Dinas Brân, Llangollen, Denbighshire: Condition Survey (PDF) (Report). Clwyd-Powys Archaeological Trust.
- Kightly, Charles (2003), Dinas Brân Castle, Denbighshire County Council
- King, D. J. Cathcart (1974), "Two Castles in Northern Powys: Dinas Bran and Caergwrle", Archaeologia Cambrensis, CXXIII: 113–139
- Oman, Charles W. C. (1989) [1926], British Castles, Dover Books
- Pierce, G. Owen (1968), The place-names of Dinas Powys Hundred, University of Wales Press
- Roseveare, Martin J. (2017), Castell Dinas Bran, Llangollen, Denbighshire: Geophysical Survey Report (PDF), Tigergeo and the Castle Studies Trust
- Tregellas, Walter H. (1864), "Castell Dinas Bran" (PDF), The Archaeological Journal, 21: 114–120, doi:10.1080/00665983.1864.10851279
- Tregellas, Walter H. (1865), "Castell Dinas Bran near Llangollen, Denbighshire", Archaeologia Cambrensis: 49–58
