= Brochfael =

Brochfael is a masculine given name. Notable people with the name include:

- Brochfael ab Elisedd, king of Powys
- Brochfael ap Meurig, king of Gwent
- Brochfael Ysgithrog, king of Powys

== See also ==
- Cadell ap Brochfael, king of Powys
