= Yale (commote) =

Welsh medieval commote

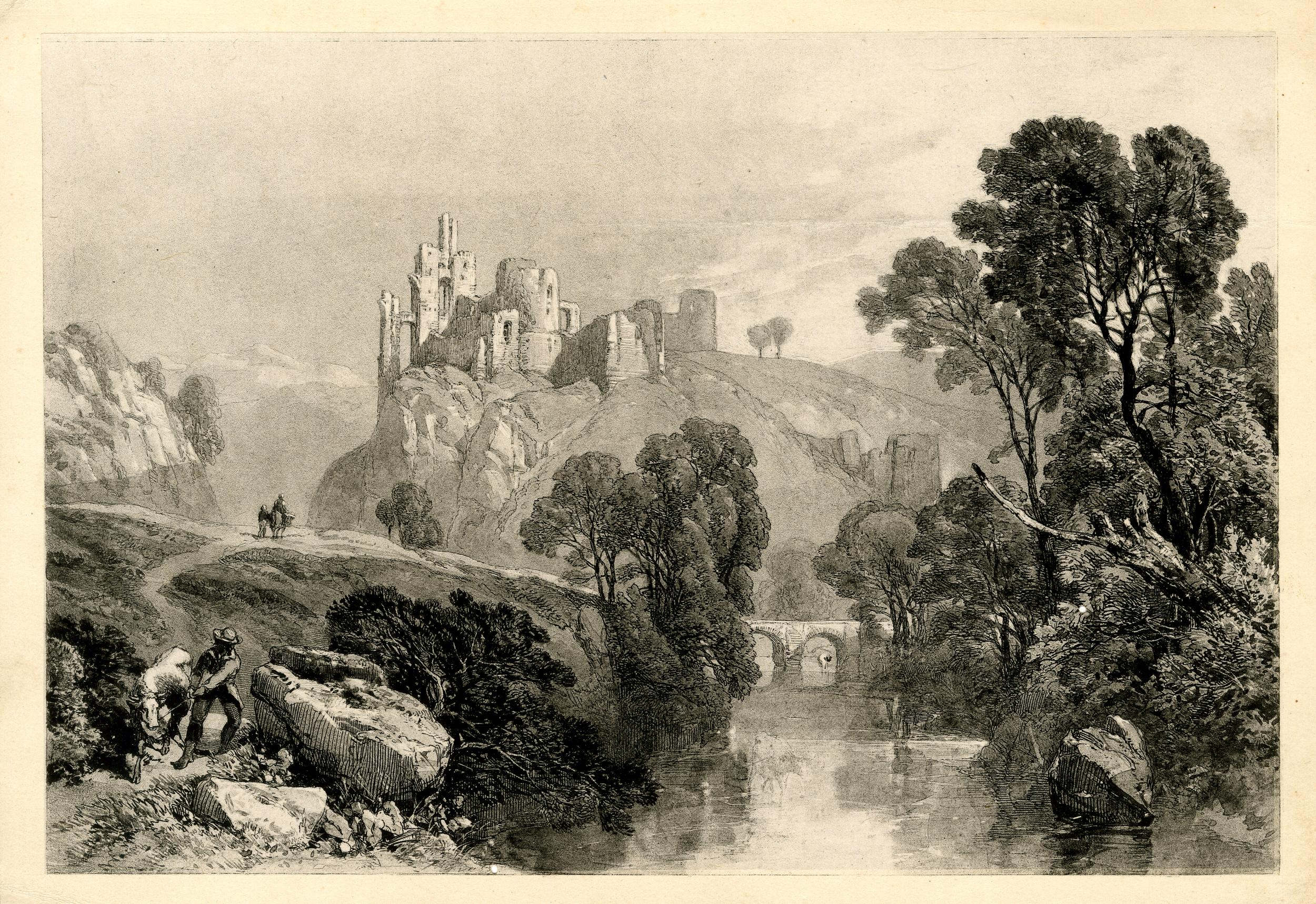
Castell Dinas Bran, North Wales, also known as Castle of Yale

Yale (Welsh: Iâl) was a commote of medieval Wales within the cantref of Maelor in the Kingdom of Powys. When the Kingdom was divided in 1160, Maelor became part of the Princely realm of Powys Fadog (Lower Powys or Madog's Powys), and belonged to the Royal House of Powys. Yale eventually merged with another commote and became the Lordship of Bromfield and Yale, later a royal lordship under the Tudors and Stuarts.

== History ==
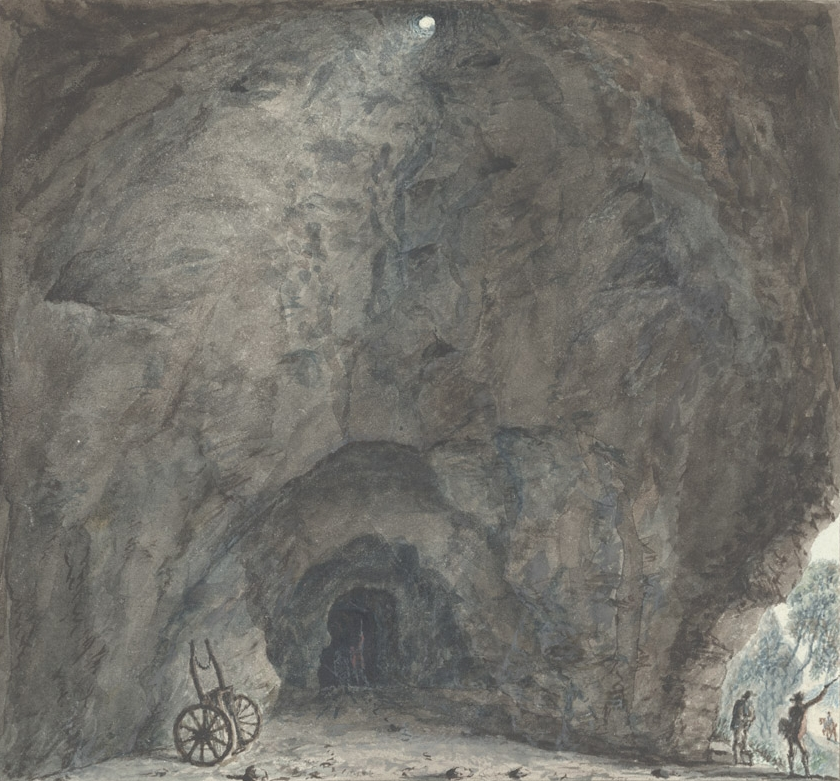
The Neolithic cave next to Castle Tomen y Faerdre, Llanarmon-yn-Yale, c.1795

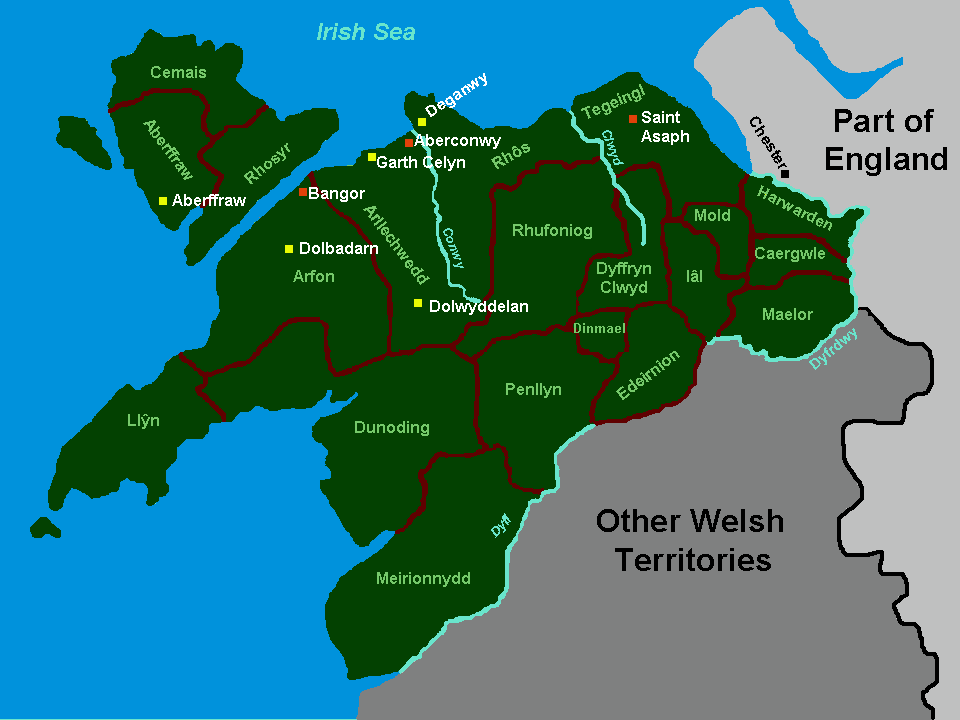
Map showing the commote of Iâl (Yale) on the right side, when part of the former Kingdom of Gwynedd

The commote of Iâl, anglicised as Yale, was the stronghold of the Principality of Powys Fadog, and its capital was at Llanarmon-yn-Iâl, in Denbighshire, Wales, in a village situated at a shrine dedicated to the Roman Bishop, Germanus of Auxerre (Welsh: Garmon).

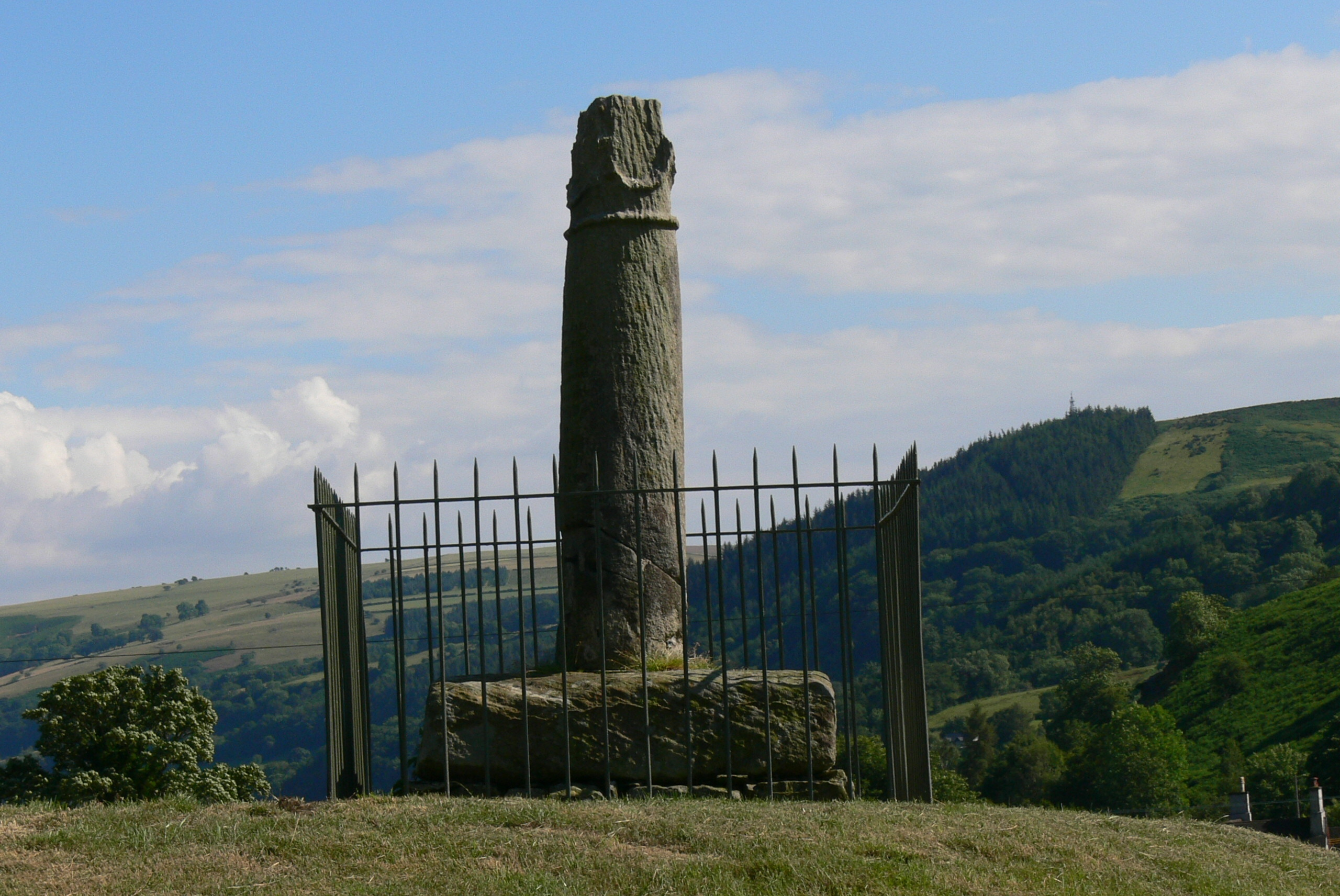
Pillar of Eliseg, 9th century stone cross next to Valle Crucis Abbey

Within the lordship, a monument dating back to the 9th century was erected by king Cyngen ap Cadell of Powys named the Pillar of Eliseg, in honor of his great-grandfather king Elisedd ap Gwylog, born c. 725. The stone cross in Llangollen, next to Valle Crucis Abbey, depicts the claimed lineage of the kings of Powys from a daughter of the 4th century Roman Emperor Magnus Maximus, of the Imperial Theodosian dynasty, named Sevira, wife of Vortigern.

One of the castles within Yale, Tomen y Faerdre, built next to a Neolithic cave, was erected by the first Prince of Wales, Owain Gwynedd, after capturing the commote from the last Prince of Powys, Madog ap Maredudd. The castle was later rebuilt by King John of England, signatory of Magna Carta and brother of Richard the Lionheart, as a way to secure the area for his military campaign against the Prince of North Wales, Llywelyn ap Iorwerth.

Other castles were built in the commote such as Tomen y Rhodwydd, also built by Owain Gwynedd, in the form of a motte and bailey castle made out of timber, and the "Castle of Yale", built by Prince Gruffydd II ap Madog, one of the Lords of Yale. For centuries the Castle of Dinas Bran was the seat and possession of the Lords of Yale.

For iron mallets for breaking the rocks in the ditch of the Castle of Yale.

— King John of England, when he re-occupied the site in 1212, in the Pipe rolls entry for 1212-13

During the Conquest of Wales by King Edward Longshanks, Iâl would be taken very early on and added to the county of Shropshire, annexing the commote into the Kingdom of England. However, the commote would remain Welsh in culture and retain Welsh laws and customs under the terms accorded by the Statute of Rhuddlan.

=== Later history ===
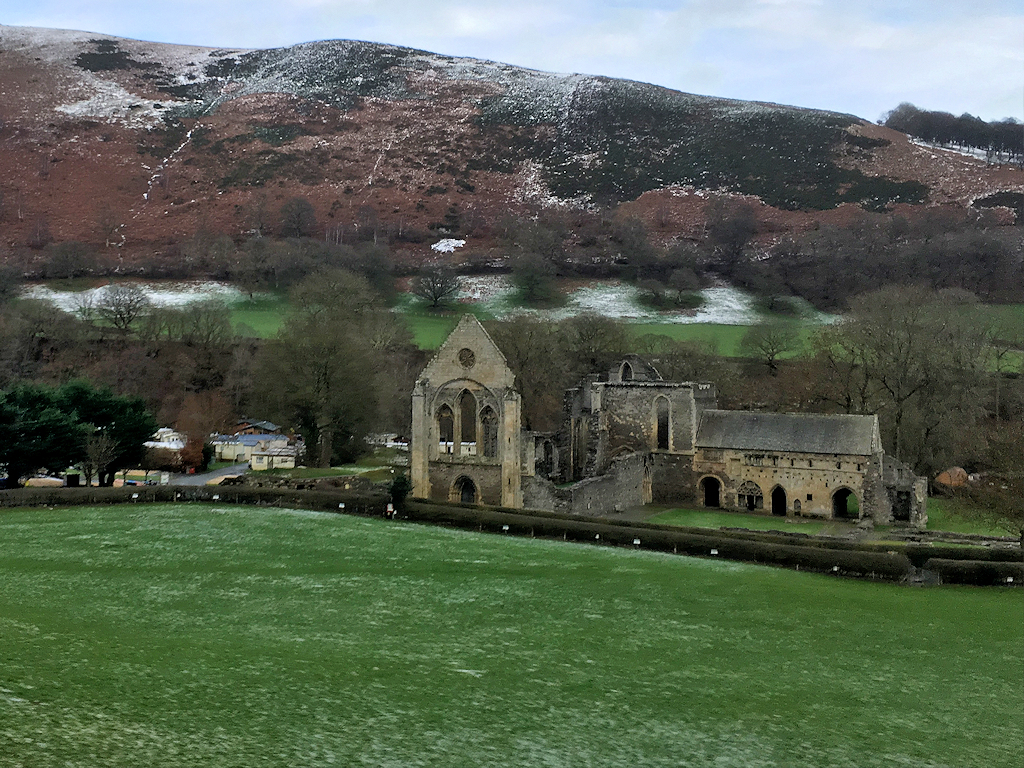
Ruins of Valle Crucis Abbey, Yale's religious center

King Edward would later merge the Lordship with others nearby, renaming it the Lordship of Bromfield and Yale, and would award it to his relative, the military commander and Guardian of Scotland, John de Warenne, 6th Earl of Surrey. After his successful conquest of Wales, King Edward would go on a campaign to conquer Scotland. John de Warenne would be one of his Commanders at the Battle of Stirling, fighting against William Wallace, and later, fighting at the Battle of Falkirk.

The title of Lord of Yale would eventually be reclaimed by the Princes of Powys Fadog, while the title of Lord of Bromfield and Yale would be passed to the Earls of Surrey of the House of Warenne, and later on, to the Earls of Arundel of the House of Howard.

The co-Lordship of Yale, when part of the Lordship of Bromfield and Yale, featured the manor of Llan Egwestl belonging to Valle Crucis Abbey, and the manor of Llandegla belonging to St Asaph Cathedral, next to Horseshoe falls, in Llangollen. Valle Crucis Abbey was Yale's religious center, its monastery, and the main burial place of the princes of Powys Fadog. It was referred to as the Rome of Yale by poet Gutun Owain during the Tudor period.

The rest of the Lordship of Yale was divided into two manors called the Manor of Yale Raglaria, and the Manor of Yale Praepositura, dating back to the Welsh period before English rule. Anglicized as the Manor of Yale Raglar, it later belonged to Roger, son of John Wynne, ancestor of the Rogers of Bryntagor and the Yales of Plas-yn-Yale.

In 1536, with the Act of Union brought forward by Thomas Cromwell on behalf of Henry VIII, the Welsh marcher lordships like Yale lost their special status and became unified with England.
