= Battle of Hereford =

Coordinates: 52.0560°N 2.7175°W

Date	760
Location	Hereford
Result	Welsh victory

Belligerents
Mercia	Britons (Welsh)

Commanders and leaders
Offa of Mercia?	King Nowy Hen of Brycheiniog, Eliseg of Powys

The Battle of Hereford was fought in 760 at Hereford (in what is now Herefordshire, England). The conflict followed decades of hostility between the Welsh Kingdoms of Brycheiniog, Gwent and Powys by Æthelbald of Mercia and Coenred of Wessex, and involved the armies of Mercia and the Welsh. The Welsh were said to have defeated the Mercian army, and freed themselves from the influence of the Anglo-Saxons.

Which Welsh kingdom led the offensive is uncertain. Both King Nowy Hen of Brycheiniog and Eliseg of Powys have been put forward as candidates.
