= Gwylog ap Beli =

Ruler of Kingdom of Powys

King of Powys
- Reign: 695?–725
- Predecessor: Beli ab Eiludd
- Successor: Elisedd ap Gwylog
- Died: c. 725
- Issue: Elisedd ap Gwylog
- Father: Beli ab Eiludd
- Mother: possibly Heledd ferch Cyndrwyn

Gwylog ap Beli was one of the rulers of the Kingdom of Powys during the late 7th to early 8th Century, son of Beli ab Eiludd. There is also a small possibility his mother was Heledd ferch Cyndrwyn, the narrator of the Canu Heledd, as she would have been welcomed by his father Beli after the defeat at Maes Cogwy.

He is recorded on the Pillar of Eliseg as Guoillauc.
