= Cadell ap Brochfael =

King of Powys

King of Powys
- Reign: 773–808
- Predecessor: Brochfael ab Elisedd
- Successor: Cyngen ap Cadell
- Died: c. 808
- Issue: Cyngen ap Cadell Nest ferch Cadell
- Father: Brochfael ab Elisedd

Cadell ap Brochfael ('Cadell, son of Brochfael'; died c. 808), also known as Cadell Powys, was an 8th- and 9th-century king of Powys.

He was the son of Brochfael ab Elisedd, whom he succeeded to the throne c. 773.

The Annals of Wales mention his death, and Phillimore's reconstruction dates the entry to AD 808. His name also was inscribed (as "Cattell") on the Pillar of Eliseg.

He was succeeded by his son Cyngen ap Cadell, the last known king of the Cadelling dynasty of Powys. Some genealogies claim that his daughter Nest became the wife of Merfyn Frych, the king of the neighbouring kingdom of Gwynedd.

Preceded by Brochfael ab Elisedd	King of Powys; 773–808	Succeeded by Cyngen ap Cadell
