= Pillar of Eliseg =

Medieval monument in Denbighshire, Wales

Coordinates: 52.99212°N 3.189316°W

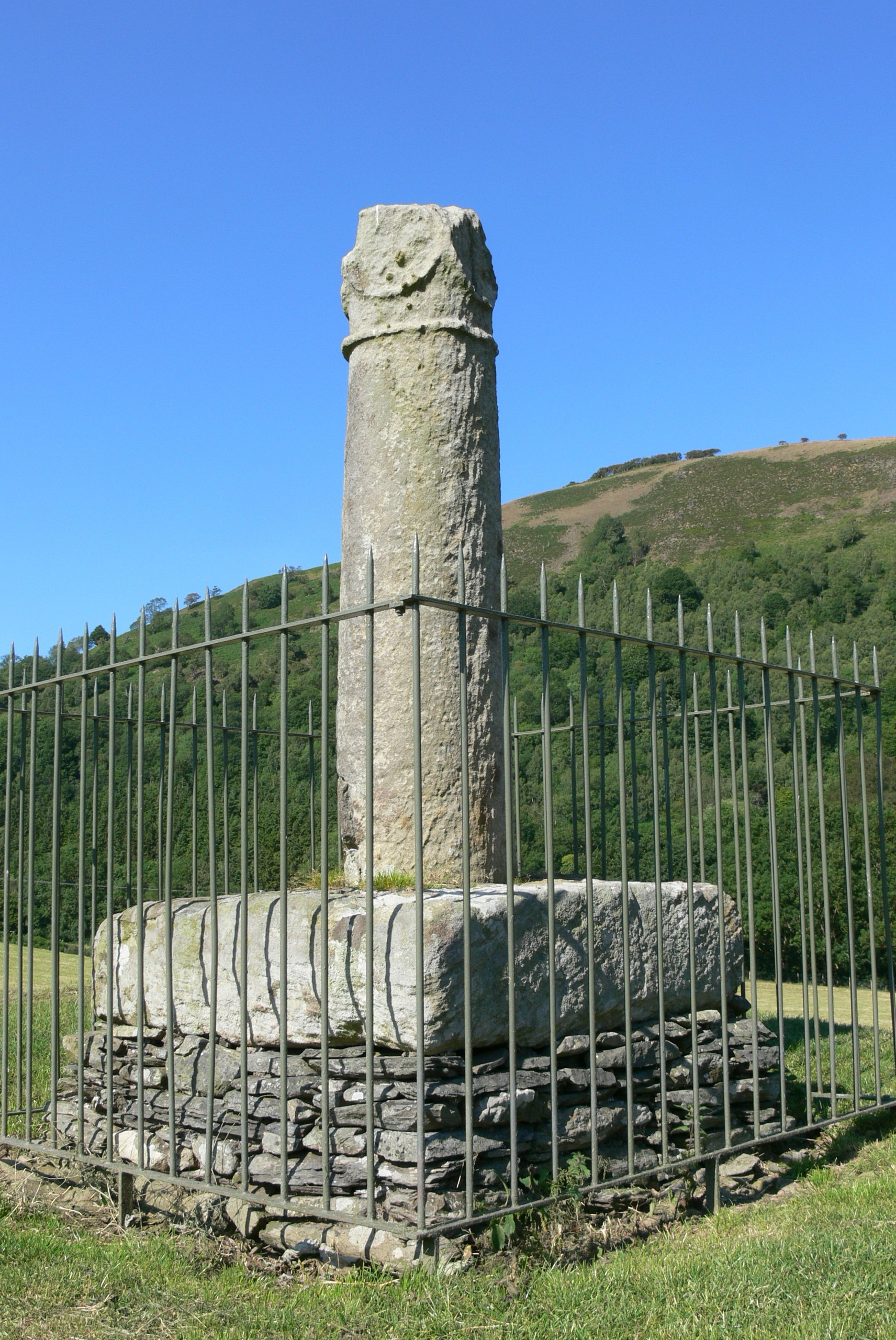
The Pillar of Eliseg

The Pillar of Eliseg – also known as Elise's Pillar or Croes Elisedd in Welsh – stands near Valle Crucis Abbey, Denbighshire, Wales [Grid reference SJ 20267 44527]. It was erected by Cyngen ap Cadell (died 855), king of Powys in honour of his great-grandfather Elisedd ap Gwylog. The spelling of Elisedd as Eliseg found on the pillar is assumed to be a mistake by the carver of the inscription.

== History ==
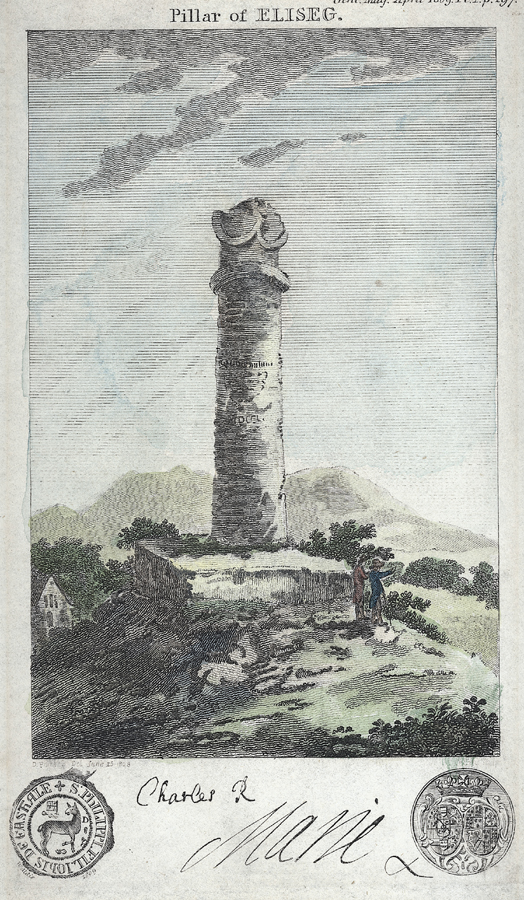
The Pillar of Eliseg in 1809

Whilst the pillar itself dates to the 9th century, the large artificial mound is thought to be significantly older, probably from the Early Bronze Age. The pillar itself was built within the lordship of Yale.

== Inscription ==
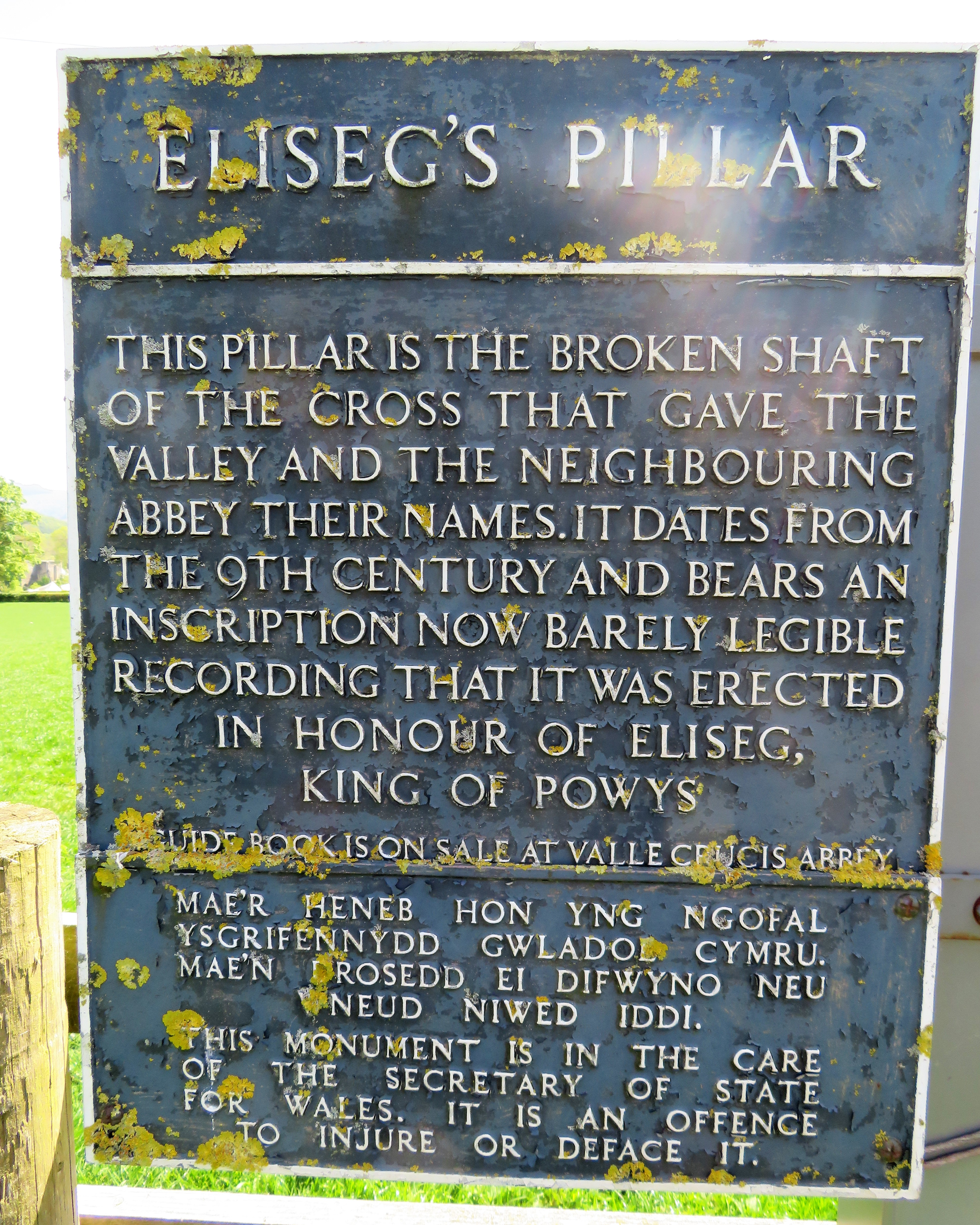
Eliseg's Column; next to Valle Crucis Abbey, Llangollen, Wales; erected by King Cyngen ap Cadell

The Latin inscription consisted of some thirty-one lines of insular script. It not only mentioned several individuals described in the Historia Brittonum, but also complemented the information presented in that text. Considerable portions of the original inscription were read by the antiquarian Edward Lluyd in 1696 and his transcript seems to have been remarkably accurate according to Robert Vermaat of Vortigern Studies.

A generally accepted translation of this inscription, one of the longest surviving inscriptions from pre-Viking Wales, is as follows:

Concenn filius Cattell Cattell / filius Brohcmail Brohcmal filius / Eliseg Eliseg filius Guoillauc
Concenn itaque pronepos Eliseg / edificauit hunc lapidem proauo / suo Eliseg
Ipse est Eliseg qui nec/xit(?) hereditatem Pouos … mort / c autem(?) per uim …e potestate Anglo/[rum]…in gladio suo parta in igne /
Quicu]mque recit(a)uerit manescr[i]p/[tum] … m det benedictionem supe/[r animam] Eliseg
Ipse est Concenn /……… … manu / ……… e ad regnum suum Pouos / …… …… et quod / …… … …… / …… …… montem /… ………… /………
… monarchiam / … … ail Maximus Brittanniae / … nn Pascen[t] … Mau[n] Annan / … Britu a[u]t[e]m filius Guarthi/[girn] que(m) bened[ixit] Germanus que(m) / … peperit ei Se[v]ira filia Maximi / [re]gis qui occidit regem Romano/rum
Conmarch pinxit hoc / chirografu(m) rege suo poscente / Concenn
Benedictio d(omi)ni in Con/cenn et s(imilite)r(?) i(n) tota familia eius / et in(?) tota ragione(m?) Pouois / usque in …

Translation:

Concenn son of Cattell, Cattell son of Brochmail, Brochmail son of Eliseg, Eliseg son of Guoillauc.
And that Concenn, great-grandson of Eliseg, erected this stone for his great-grandfather Eliseg.
The same Eliseg, who joined together the inheritance of Powys ... throughout nine (years?) out of the power of the Angles with his sword and with fire.
Whosoever shall read this hand-inscribed stone, let him give a blessing on the soul of Eliseg.
This is that Concenn who ... with his hand ... to his kingdom of Powys ... and which ... the mountain
[the column is broken here. One line, possibly more, lost]
... the monarchy ... Maximus ... of Britain ... Concenn, Pascent, Maun Annan ... Britu son of Vortigern, whom Germanus blessed, and whom Sevira bore to him, daughter of Maximus the king, who killed the king of the Romans.
Conmarch painted this writing at the request of king Concenn.
The blessing of the Lord be upon Concenn and upon his entire household, and upon the entire region of Powys until ...

The pillar was thrown down by the Roundheads during the English Civil War and a grave under it opened. Edward Lhuyd examined the pillar and copied the inscription in 1696. The lower half disappeared but the upper half was re-erected in 1779. The original inscription is now illegible.

== Archaeological examination ==
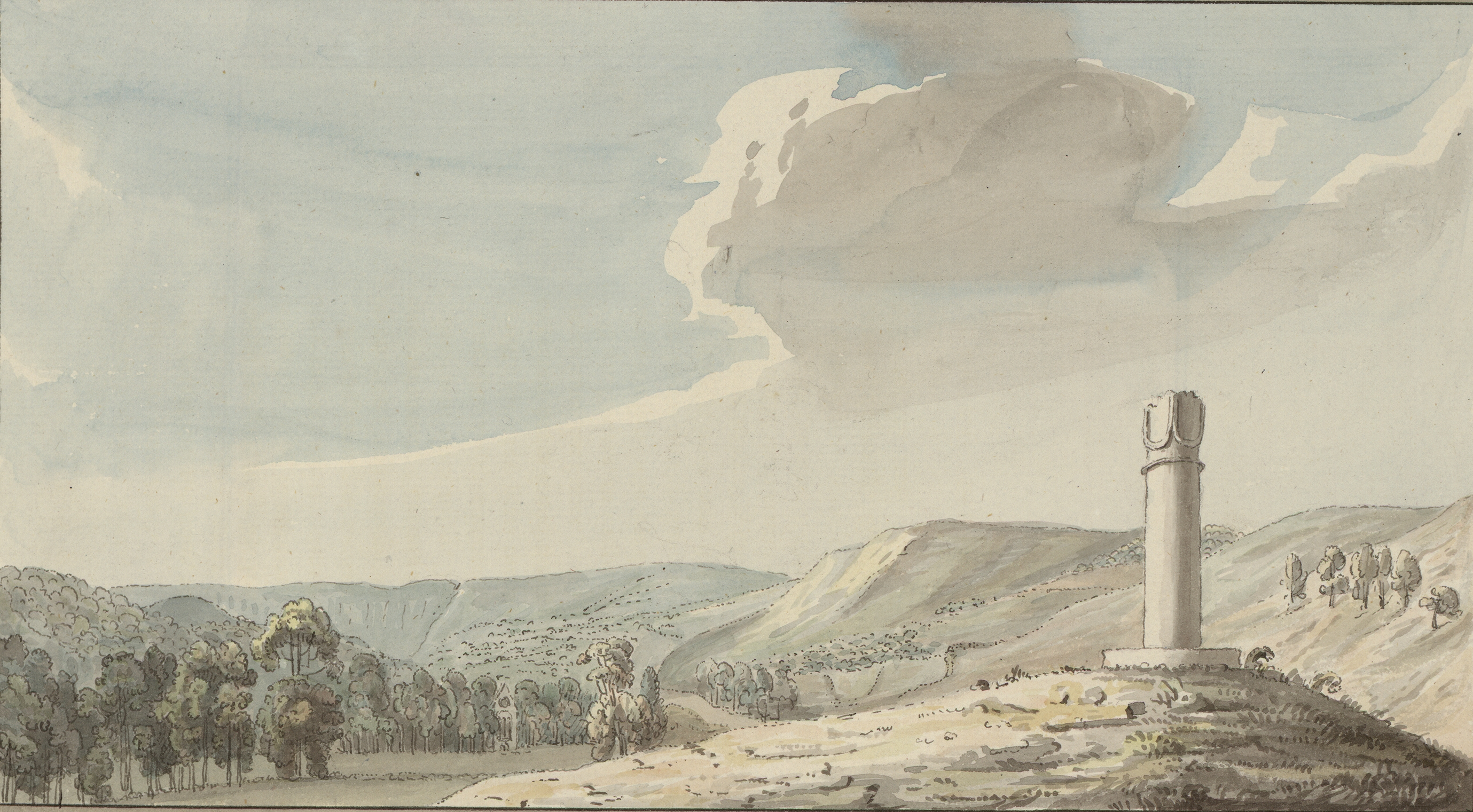
Pillar of Eliseg, Clwydian Range and Dee Valley, in the ancient Lordship of Yale

Trevor Lloyd, the landowner in 1773, is said to have conducted an examination and found a stone cist burial in which he claimed to have found a skeleton and artefacts, which he removed.

The mound that supports the pillar was subjected to excavation in the years 2010, 2011 and 2012 by Project Eliseg. This established that the earliest phase of construction was that of a kerbed platform cairn, dated by type to around 2000 BC. A small cist in the first phase of construction yielded evidence of burnt human bone, confirming its use as a burial site. The second phase of construction consisted of a raising in height of the cairn and contained a large cist considered as Early Bronze Age; however, no human remains were found. A further cist was found in this phase which contained 7 kg of cremated bone, representing numerous adult, juvenile and infant burials. A flint knife and a bone pin were also recovered. The final phase of construction appeared to be relatively modern and probably subsequent to the re-erection of the cross.

== See also ==
- Magnus Maximus
- Gratian
- King Doniert's Stone – contemporary Cornish cross
