= Brochfael ab Elisedd =

8th-century king of Powys, in Wales

King of Powys
- Reign: 755?–773
- Predecessor: Elisedd ap Gwylog
- Successor: Cadell ap Brochfael
- Died: c. 773
- Issue: Cadell ap Brochfael
- Father: Elisedd ap Gwylog

Brochfael ab Elisedd was a king of Powys in the mid-8th century, who inherited the throne from his father, Elisedd ap Gwylog. Upon his death, he was succeeded by his son, Cadell ap Brochfael. His name also was inscribed (as "Brochmail") in the Pillar of Eliseg.
