= Walter Hawken Tregellas =

British writer and draughtsman

Walter Hawken Tregellas (10 July 1831 – 28 May 1894) was a British writer of historical, biographical and other works. He was also a professional draughtsman.

== Life and writings ==
Tregellas was the eldest son of John Tabois Tregellas (1792–1863), merchant at Truro, purser of Cornish mines, and author of many stories written in the local dialect of the county; John Tabois Tregellas married at St. Mary's, Truro, on 23 October 1828, Anne (1801–1867), second daughter of Richard Hawken. Walter was educated under his uncle, John Hawken, at Trevarth School, Gwennap, from 1838 to 1845, and from 1845 to 1847 at the grammar school of Truro.

Tregellas was, from youth, fond of drawing, and won prizes as an artist at the Royal Cornwall Polytechnic Society, Falmouth, from 1846 to 1848. He began his active life as a draughtsman in the War Office on 10 July 1855, was promoted to be second draughtsman on 28 February 1860, rose to be chief draughtsman on 24 May 1866, and retained the post until 1 August 1893. He died at Deal on 28 May 1894, and was buried in its cemetery on 30 May. He married at Holy Trinity Church, Brompton, on 2 November 1861, Zoe, third daughter of Charles Lucas (1808–1869). His wife survived him; they had no issue.

=== Writings ===
Tregellas was the author of an anonymous volume on China, the Country, History, and People, published by the Religious Tract Society (1867). He compiled Stanford's Tourists' Guide to Cornwall (1878; 7th edit. revised by H. M. Whitley, 1895); two excellent volumes on Cornish Worthies (London, 1884, 8vo) (possibly inspired by the Worthies of Devon by Rev. John Prince (1643–1723); and A History of the Horse Guards, 1880. A work on the history of the Tower of London is still in manuscript. He contributed papers to the Archæological Journal (1864–6), the Journal of the Royal Institution of Cornwall (1883, 1891), and to other periodicals.

His Historical Sketch of the Defences of Malta was printed for the Royal Engineers' Institute at Chatham in 1879, and Historical Sketch of the Coast Defences of England appeared in the Royal Engineer Institute Occasional Papers (vol. XII, paper ii, 1886). A paper by him on County Characteristics, Cornwall, came out in the Nineteenth Century, November 1887. The lives of many eminent Cornishmen were written by Tregellas in the first thirteen volumes of the Dictionary of National Biography.

Selected works

- Cornish Worthies, vol.1
- Cornish Worthies, vol.2

== Sources ==
- This article incorporates text from a publication now in the public domain: "Tregellas, Walter Hawken". Dictionary of National Biography. London: Smith, Elder & Co. 1885–1900.
