= Elisedd ap Gwylog =

King of Powys in eastern Wales

King of Powys
- Reign: 725–755?
- Predecessor: Gwylog ap Beli
- Successor: Brochfael ap Elisedd
- Died: c. 755?
- Issue: Brochfael ap Elisedd
- Father: Gwylog ap Beli

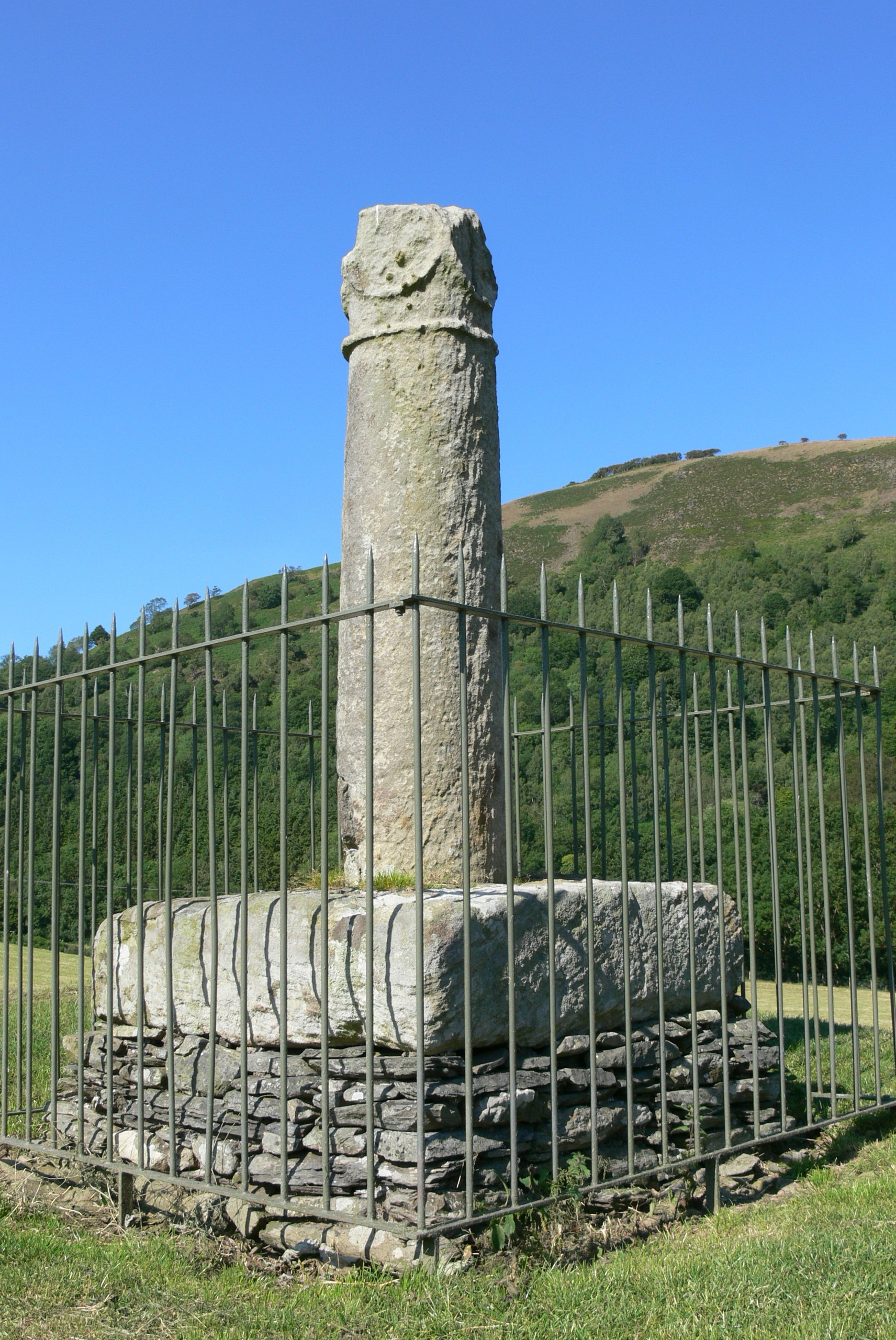
The Pillar of Eliseg

Elisedd ap Gwylog (died c. 755?), also known as Elise, was king of Powys in eastern Wales, son of Gwylog ap Beli.

Little has been preserved in the historical records about Elisedd, who was a descendant of Brochwel Ysgithrog. He appears to have reclaimed the territory of Powys after it had been overrun by the English. His great-grandson, Cyngen ap Cadell, erected a column in his memory which stands not far from the later abbey of Valle Crucis. This is known as the Pillar of Eliseg, but the form Eliseg which appears on the column is thought to be a mistake by the carver of the inscription.

The Latin inscription on the pillar is now very hard to read, but was apparently clearer in the time of Edward Lhuyd, who transcribed it. The translation of the part of the inscription referring to Elisedd is as follows:

+ Concenn son of Catell, Catell son of Brochmail, Brochmail son of Eliseg, Eliseg son of Guoillauc.
+ And that Concenn, great-grandson of Eliseg, erected this stone for his great-grandfather Eliseg.
+ The same Eliseg, who joined together the inheritance of Powys . . . out of the power of the Angles with his sword and with fire.
+ Whosoever repeats the writing, let him give a blessing on the soul of Eliseg.

Some old poems refer to Elisedd and assert he had a "special crown, a chain of twisted gold links, and armlets and anklets of gold which were the badges of sovereignty of Powys".

Elisedd was succeeded by his son Brochfael ab Elisedd.

Preceded by Gwylog ap Beli	King of Powys c. 725 – c. 755	Succeeded by Brochfael ab Elisedd
