= List of Anglo-Welsh wars =

This is an incomplete list of the wars and battles between the Anglo-Saxons who later formed into the Kingdom of England and the Britons (the pre-existing Brythonic population of Britain south of the Antonine Wall who came to be known later by the English as the Welsh), as well as the conflicts between the English and Welsh in subsequent centuries. The list begins after the Adventus Saxonum in c. AD 446 (when the Anglo-Saxons are said to have arrived in Britain) to the late Middle Ages when England annexed the whole of Wales in 1535. The list is not exhaustive but seeks to note the significant campaigns and the major battles.

== 5th century ==
Pagan Germanic tribes who colonized parts of the eastern and southern coasts of Britannia attacked the Britons, whom the Anglo-Saxons dubbed Wīelisċ (“Welsh; Briton; Roman; Celt”), in a series of immigrations and coordinated uprisings. Additional reinforcements from Old Saxony, Angeln, Flanders and Jutland make landings and mostly through treaty occupy large areas of eastern and south eastern Britain.

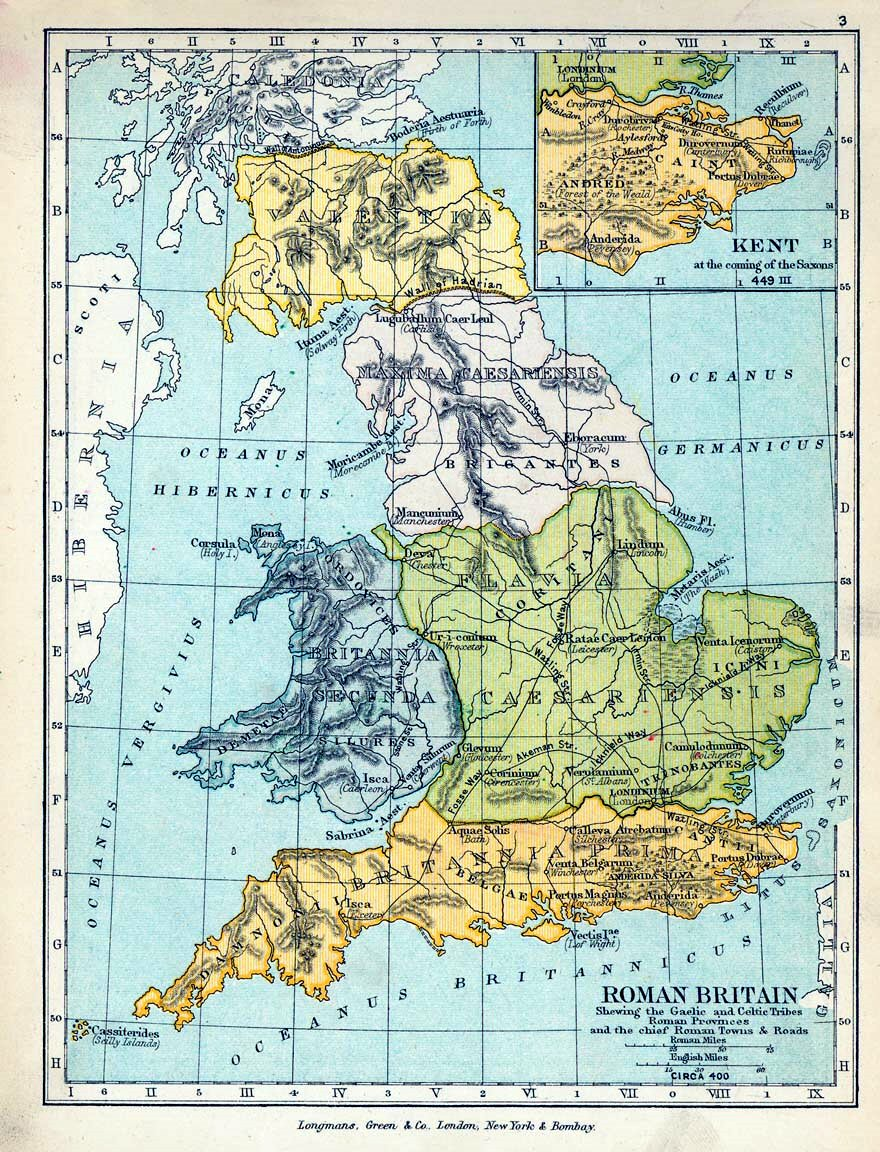

- The Germanic people settled on the eastern "Saxon Shore" of Britain rise in a revolt led by Hengest and his sons against their Romano British masters.
- Battle of Aylesford – Anglo-Saxons (particularly a group called Jutes) led by Hengest defeat the Britons (Welsh) led by Vortimer in Battle of Aylesford, Kent.
- Battle of Crayford – Anglo-Saxons (Jutes) led again by Hengest perhaps defeat the Britons (Welsh) led by Vortimer in battle. The Britons are allegedly driven from (Kent) which is afterwards ruled by Hengist and his son Æsc and their descendants.
- Battle of Wippedesfleot – Britons (Welsh) defeat the Anglo-Saxons (Jutes) in battle in Kent and confine them to the Isle of Thanet.
- The Anglo-Saxons (Jutes) move westwards and regain their ground in Kent.
- Battle of Cymensora – Anglo-Saxons (Saxons) led by Ælle defeat the Cantii close to Selsey.
- Siege of Anderida – Anglo-Saxons (Saxons) led by Ælle capture the Castle of Anderida from the Britons and slaughter all men, women and children therein. Ælle establishes the Kingdom of the South Saxons (Sussex).
- Cerdic reputedly defeats the Britons (Welsh) in battle close to modern day Bournemouth and establishes kingdom of the West Saxons (Wessex).

=== Arthurian Battles listed in the Historia Brittonum. ===
- Battle on the River Glein – Arthur, general of the British forces, and the British kings defeat the Anglo-Saxons.
- Second, third and fourth battles of Arthur at the river Dubglas in Linnuis - thought to be the old Kingdom of Lindsey, where he led the Britons to victory over the Anglo-Saxons at each battle.
- Battle at the river Bassas – Arthur defeats the Anglo-Saxons.
- Battle in the Caledonian forest – Arthur defeats the Anglo-Saxons(?) somewhere in the Caledonian forest in Scotland.
- Battle of the fort (castellum) of Guinnion – Arthur defeats the Anglo-Saxons.
- Battle of "City of the Legion(s)" (urbs Legionis) – Arthur defeats the Anglo-Saxons, which is thought to probably be Caerleon or Chester, both known anciently as "city of the legion(s)".
- Battle of the river shore of Tribruit – Arthur defeats the Anglo-Saxons.
- Battle of the hill of Breguoin – Arthur defeats the Anglo-Saxons at what is believed to be the old Roman fortress of Bremenium in Rochester, Northumberland.
- Battle of Mons Badonicus – The Anglo-Saxons are soundly defeated by the Britons (possibly led by King Arthur). This defeat allegedly ends the Saxon attacks for decades.

== 6th century ==
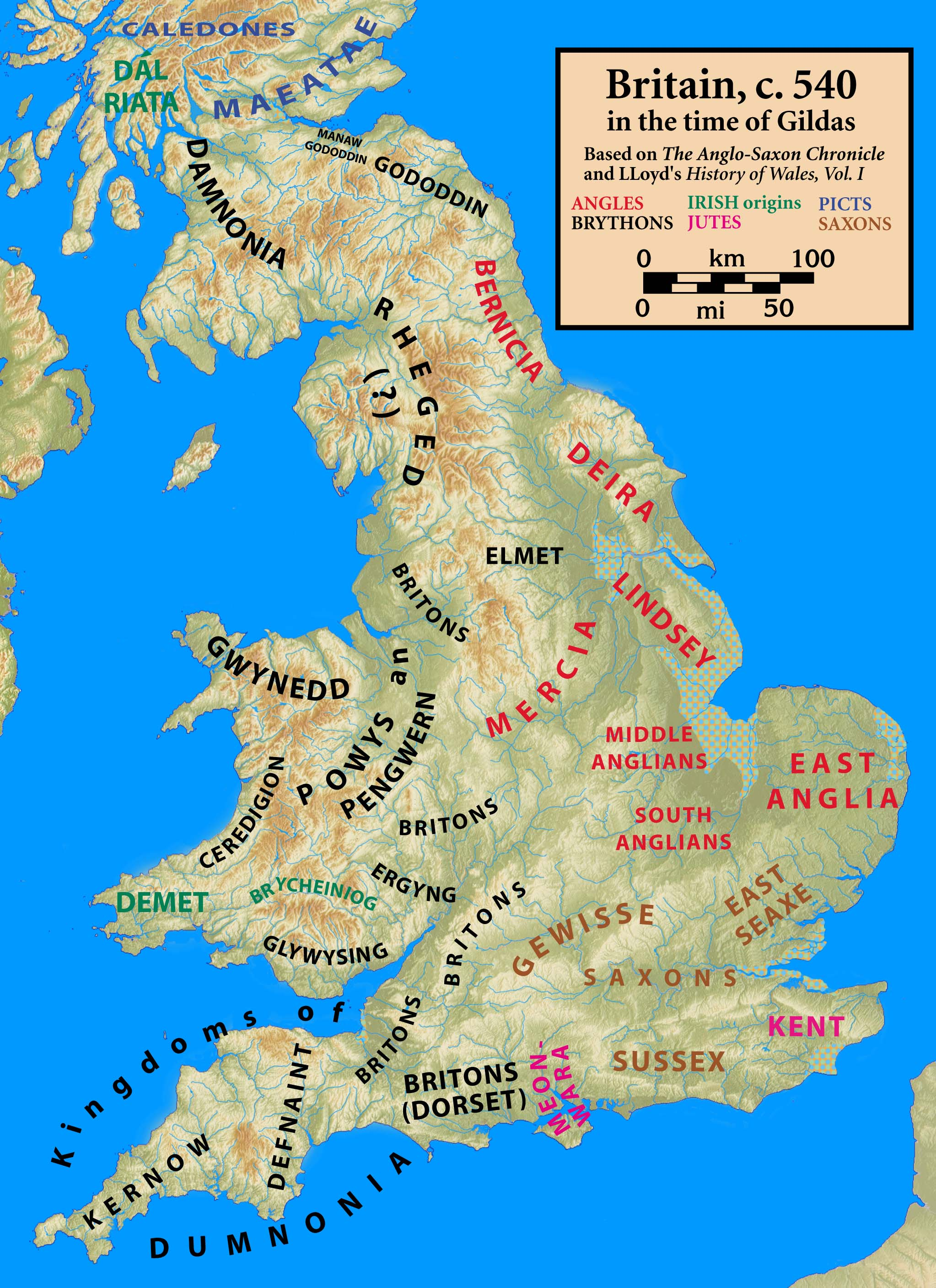

Pagan Anglo-Saxon tribes conquer southern Britain capturing London, Colchester, Silchester, Chichester, Winchester, Grantchester, Leicester, Gloucester, Cirencester, Bath, York, Lincoln and Canterbury among other places. Later in the century Angles defeat the northern Britons and colonize the north eastern coast.

- c.509 Battle of Natanleod – the West Saxons allegedly led by Cerdic defeat the Britons at Netley, Hampshire.
- 519 Another supposed battle in which Cerdic is victorious. He establishes the Kingdom of Wessex at this point.
- 527 Battle of Cerdicesleag – the West Saxons led by Cerdic and his son Cynric defeat the Britons.
- 530 The Britons of the Isle of Wight are overrun by the Anglo-Saxons (Jutes).
- 547 the Northern Angles led by Ida the Flamebearer capture the fortress of Din Guyaroi from the Britons of the Kingdom of Bryneich.
- c.550 Presumed date for the fall of Londinium (London) and Camulodunum (Colchester) to the East Saxons.
- 575 a northern alliance of the Britons led by King Urien of Rheged defeat the Angles of Bernicia and besiege them on Ynys Metcaut for three days.
- 577 Battle of Deorham where the West Saxons and their allies captured the British fortress at Hinton Hill near Dyrham in modern Gloucestershire. The British of the Severn Valley attempted to retake this strategic location but were defeated with three of their kings killed in the fighting, according to Later accounts by Saxon monks. The West Saxons went on to capture Gloucester, Cirencester and Bath thus separating the Britons of the South West Peninsula from the Britons of modern Wales.
- 580 Battle of Ebrauc where the Angles of Bernicia capture the city of Ebrauc (modern York).
- 584 Battle of Tintern where the armies of the Kingdom of Gwent, led by Tewdrig and his son Meurig defeated the English and forced them to retreat from the Gloucester area. Tewdrig was mortally wounded and died three days after the battle.
- 590 the northern alliance of the Britons is defeated following the assassination of their leader and divisions between the former allies.
- 598 Battle of Catraeth – the northern Angles led by Æthelfrith defeat the forces of the Britons of Gododdin and Bryneich (Bernicia).

== 7th century ==
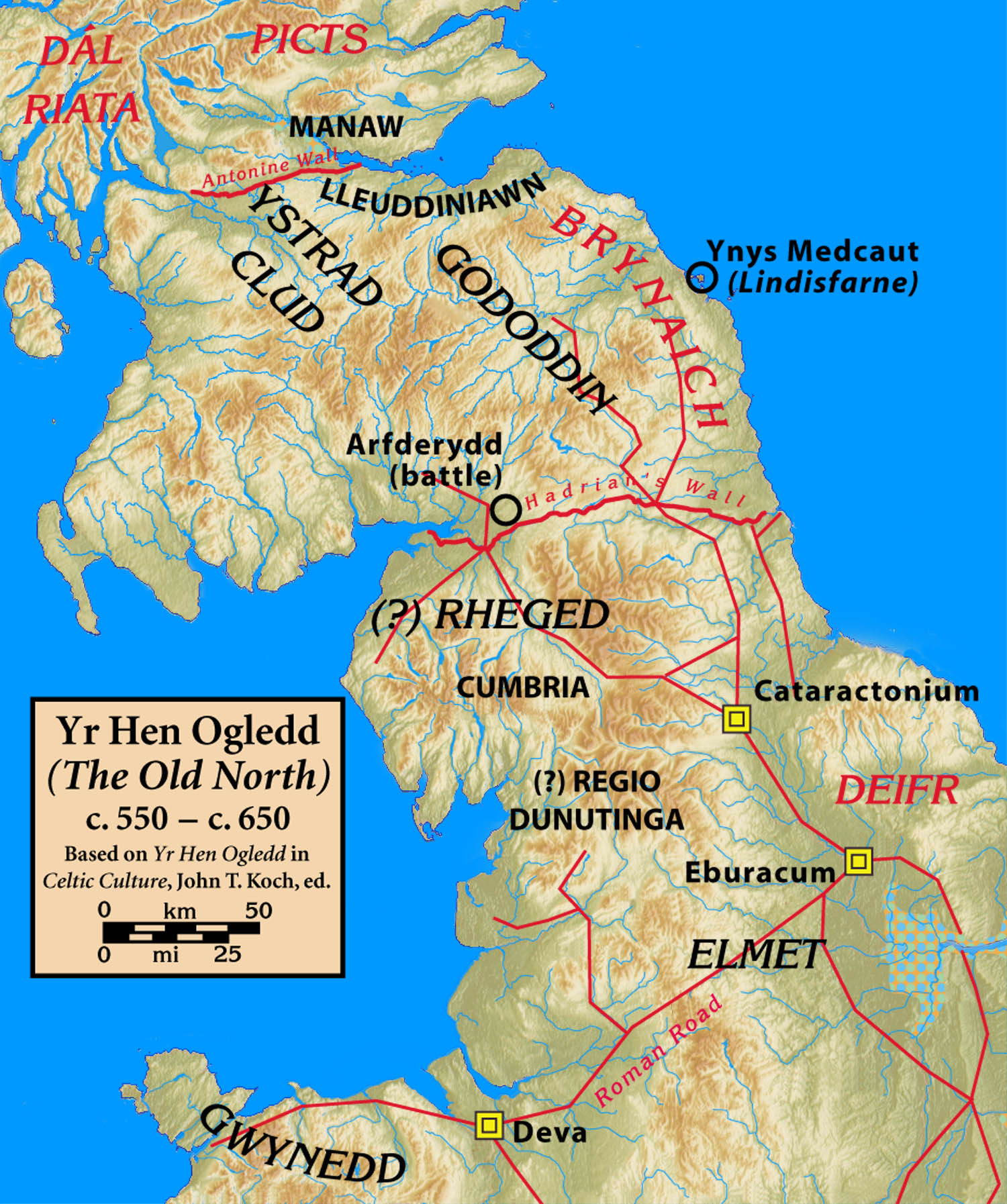

The Anglo-Saxons consolidate their hold on southern and eastern Britain. The Mercian Angles made substantial gains in central Britain (today known as the English Midlands). Cambria is cut off from the Britons of the north west and the south west. The Anglo-Saxons convert to Christianity by the middle of the century. The last serious attempts by the Britons to reclaim Britain fail.

- 614 Battle of Beandun – The West Saxons led by Cynegils defeat the West Britons, possibly led by Tewdwr ap Peredur, at Badbury Rings, Dorset. In what is speculated to have been a siege over two thousand British warriors died following the capture of the fort, according to later Saxon accounts. After this battle it is possible Dorset was annexed by Wessex.
- 616 Battle of Chester – the Northern Angles of Northumbria led by Aethelfrith of Northumbria defeat an alliance of Powys and Gwynedd and capture the city of Chester.
- 619 The united Northumbrian Angles led by Edwin of Northumbria invade and conquer Elmet, a British territory close to modern Leeds. The Kingdom of Elmet is occupied and its last ruler, Ceretic, is driven into exile in Powys where soon after he dies.
- 629 The Northumbrians invade Gwynedd and drive Cadwallon ap Cadfan into exile.
- 630 The Battle of Pont y Saeson Tewdrig King of Gwent together with Meurig, slaughtered the invading Saxons
- 630 "The Battle of Cefn Digoll, also known as the Battle of the Long Mynd was a battle fought in 630 at Long Mountain near Welshpool, won by the British .
- 633 Battle of Hatfield Chase near Doncaster. The battle was fought between the Northumbrian army of King Edwin and an alliance between King Cadwallon of Gwynedd and Penda of Mercia. The battle ended in the death of Edwin and drove the Northumbrian invaders out of Gwynedd, and preceded a British campaign into Northumbria. Cadwallon occupies Northumbria, capturing York and killing many members of the Northumbrian dynasty that invaded Gwynedd.
- 634 Battle of Heavenfield near Hadrian's Wall where Cadwallon is defeated and killed by the Northumbrians led by Oswald of Northumbria. The British are driven from Northumbria ending the campaign to reclaim the North.
- 638 The Britons of Gododdin modern day Edinburgh area are defeated at Catterick, North Yorkshire|(Catraeth).
- 642 Battle of Maes Cogwy near Oswestry where the British alongside their Mercian allies were defeated by the Northumbrians.
- 650 Battle of Bradford on Avon, a West Saxon victory against the West British.
- 655 Battle of the Winwaed in which King Oswiu of Bernicia defeated and killed King Penda of Mercia. King Cadafael ap Cynfeddw of Gwynedd was allied with Penda but stayed out of the battle.
- 658 The small British kingdom of Pengwern in modern Shropshire was overrun and annexed by Mercia.
- 658 Battle of Peonnum in Somerset where an allied force of the West British and Cadwaladr of Gwynedd are defeated. The West Saxons move to occupy western Somerset.
- 665 The alleged Second Battle of Badon which was allegedly a West Saxon victory against the Kingdom of Gwent and her allies.
- 670 The West Saxons led by Cenwealh capture central Somerset and establish the religious centre at Glastonbury.
- 682 the West Saxons led by Centwine move westwards and defeat the West British somewhere near the River Parrett, allegedly driving them "to the sea".
- c.685 The Brut y Tywysogion records a British victory in the south west with naval support, including allies from the Kingdom of Brittany that forces the West Saxons back from some of their gains.

== 8th century ==
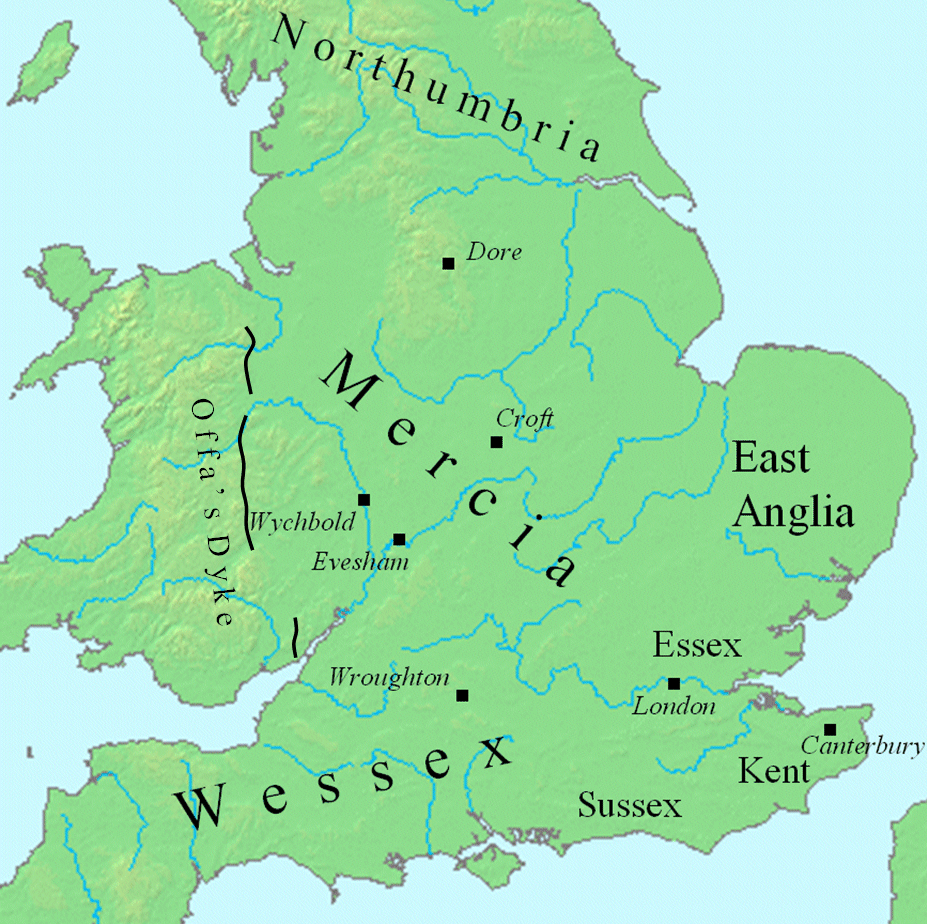

The British territories in the south west (now Cornwall and much of Devon) defend themselves and push the English back. The borders of modern Wales are broadly defined, as Mercian expansion grinds to a halt.

- 710: After defeating the West British of Devon, led by Geraint of Dumnonia, and capturing the stronghold at Norton Fitzwarren, Ine of Wessex builds a fortress at Taunton to defend "his" lands. In the course of the battle King Geraint is slain.
- c.720: Battle of Hehil, in Dumnonia, where the Cornish British with support from Rhodri Molwynog are victorious against Wessex, bringing the Cornish freedom from attack for almost a century. The Brut records another battle won honorably in the same war between Rhodri and the Saxons.
- c.720: The Battle of Pencoed in Morgannwg, the Battle of Garth Maelog, and "another battle in Gwynedd" are cited by the Brut as British victories, although explicitly separated from the war against the Saxons the same year.
- 722: Ine of Wessex advances as far as the River Tamar but is defeated and withdraws. The West Saxon fortress at Taunton is destroyed.
- 728: Battle of Carno Mountain in Gwent: the British drove the Anglo-Saxons back to the River Usk, where many were drowned.
- 733: Battle of Devawdan, another British victory.
- 735: First Battle of Hereford where the British are victorious after a long and bloody fight.
- 743: An allied army of Mercians and West Saxons fight the British. Possible construction of Wat's Dyke.
- 752: Eadberht of Northumbria invades the Kingdom of Strathclyde and conquers the territory of Kyle.
- 753: the West Saxons led by Cuthred fight the British of Cornwall. The result is not known, but the Cornish preserve their independence, so a Cornish British victory seems likely.
- 755: the westward expansion of Wessex resumes. Over the next thirty or so years eastern and northern Devon is controlled by Wessex.
- 756: the Northumbrians led by Eadbert in alliance with the Picts invade the northern British Kingdom of Strathclyde and defeat their king Dumnagual who is forced to submit; thus becoming, for a while, a vassal of Northumbria. A second battle at Hereford is recorded as another British victory in the Brut y Tywysogion.
- 765: the British invade Mercia and cause much devastation.
- 769: Mercians campaign in Wales.
- 760: the Battle of Hereford is recorded as a British victory against the Mercians led by Offa. The British were probably led by Elisedd ap Gwylog of Powys and his son Brochfael.
- 780: the construction of Offa's Dyke begins. It appears this frontier ditch delineated an agreed frontier between Powys and Mercia.
- 784: it is presumed that Exeter was captured by Cynewulf of Wessex following a siege. The British invade Mercia again, causing havoc.
- 798: the Mercians led by Coenwulf of Mercia invade Wales, but later retreat, even though his forces killed the Welsh king Caradog ap Meirion.

== 9th century ==
During the first half of the century a reinvigorated Mercia almost conquers the rest of Wales. At the end of the century Viking raids on England divert some attention from the British.

Map of the extent of Hywel Dda's power Deheubarth, Hywel Dda's principality Combine to form Morgannwg

- 815: Egbert of Wessex invades Cornwall and subdues the kingdom. 820 has also been suggested as a possible date for this "invasion".
- 816: Mercians invade Powys.
- 822: Coelwulf of Mercia invades north Wales, captures Deganwy from Gwynedd, and occupies the whole of Powys.
- 825: Battle of Camelford between Wessex and the Cornish British, resulting in a West Saxon victory.
- 828: the lands of Powys are liberated from Mercian occupation by Cyngen ap Cadell. The Pillar of Eliseg was probably commissioned at this time.
- 830: Egbert of Wessex invades Powys and moves Cyngen ap Cadell to treaty. Egbert then withdraws his forces.
- 838: Battle of Hingston Down in Cornwall where a combined force of Cornish and Danes are defeated by the superior numbers of Wessex.
- 853: Burgred of Mercia overruns Powys. Cyngan ap Cadell abdicates and retires to Rome, and his kingdom is annexed by Rhodri Mawr of Gwynedd.
- 865: Burgred of Mercia leads his forces against Rhodri Mawr and briefly captures Anglesey from Gwynedd. Burgred is later driven out, and his undefended realm is invaded by the Vikings.
- 878: the British of Strathclyde in alliance with Kenneth MacAlpin invade northern Northumbria, then at war with the Vikings, and liberate the Lothian region.
- 881: Battle of the Conwy, a Welsh victory against Mercia.
- 890: at least some of the "men of Strathclyde" are forced to relocate to Gwynedd after their kingdom, much weakened by the Vikings, is overrun by Angles and Scots.

== 10th century ==
A period of relative peace as Hywel Dda comes to dominate most of Wales and forms an alliance with Wessex against the Vikings who have destroyed the power of Mercia.

- 925: the Cornish are evicted from Exeter by King Athelstan (or Æthelstan) of England, who subdues Cornwall and defines the border of Cornwall with England at the River Tamar.
- 937: The Battle of Brunanburh ("the Great War"), reputedly the bloodiest battle ever fought on British soil, where five kings died according to the Anglo-Saxon chronicles. Athelstan, brother Edmund and many allies, allegedly defeats the armies of Olaf III Guthfrithson, the Norse–Gael King of Dublin; Constantine II, King of Alba; and Owen I, King of British Strathclyde. Though relatively little known today, it was called "the greatest single battle in Anglo-Saxon history before the Battle of Hastings". Michael Livingston claimed that Brunanburh marks "the moment when Englishness came of age". Modern scholarship suggests Bromborough on the Wirral Peninsula is the site of the battle.
- 940: Idwal Foel of Gwynedd invades England, but is driven back and later deprived of his lands.
- 945: after an English invasion of the Kingdom of the Cumbrians, ruled by Dyfnwal ab Owain, the English king is recorded to have granted or given it or a portion of it to the Scottish king. How much authority the Scots had over the Cumbrians is uncertain.
- 962: King Edgar the Peaceful invades Gwynedd.
- 985: Hywel ap Ieuaf of Gwynedd is killed fighting Ælfhere, Ealdorman of Mercia.

== 11th century ==
A united kingdom of England is formed. The Welsh are united for a while under Gruffudd ap Llywelyn but he is killed in renewed infighting before the Norman Conquest of England. The new Norman masters of England launch the Norman invasion of Wales and ravage some parts of the Welsh kingdoms.

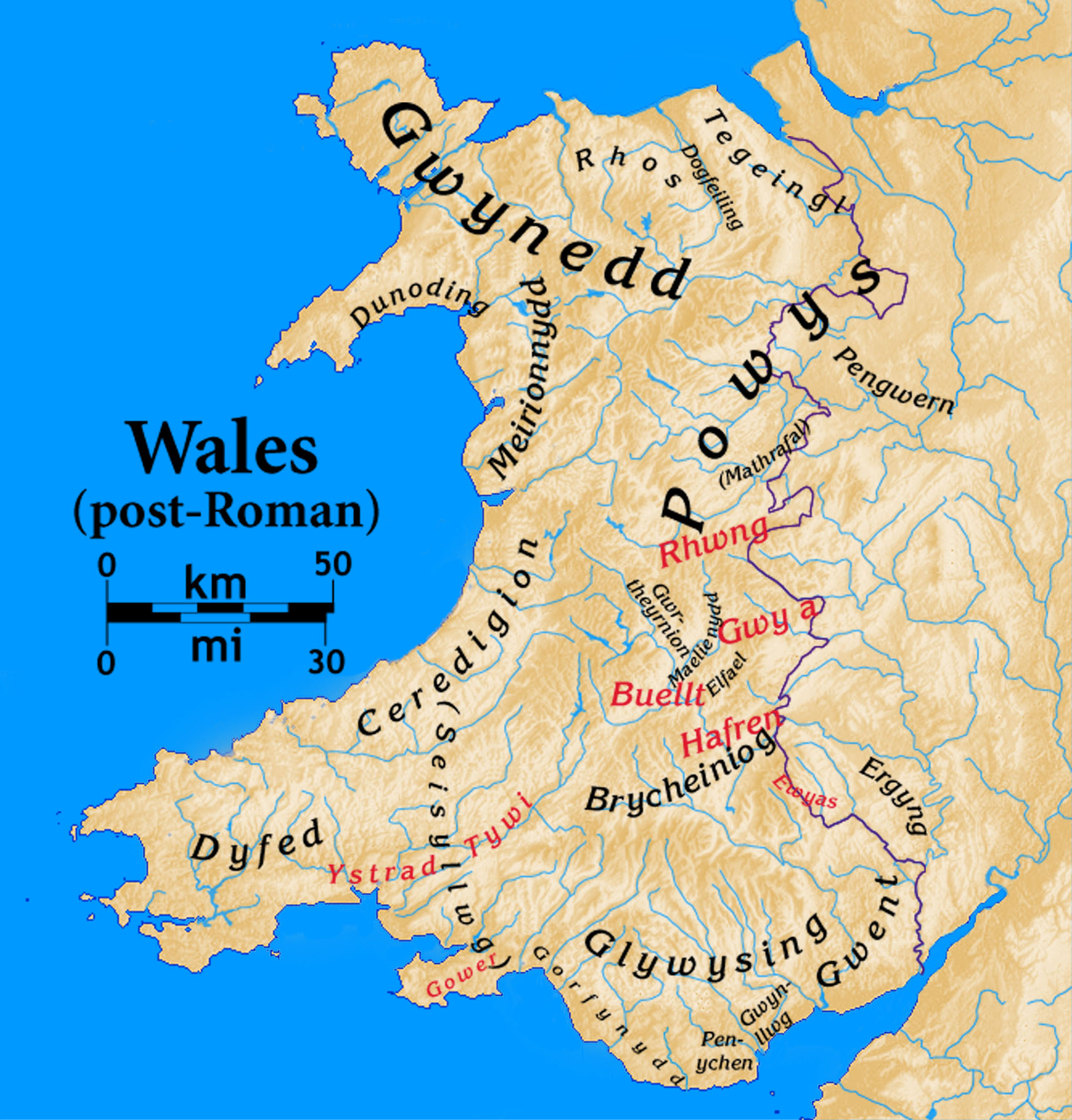
Post-Roman Welsh kingdoms.

- 1039 Battle of Rhyd y Groes where Gruffudd ap Llywelyn – the recently crowned King of Gwynedd – ambushes a Mercian army led by Leofric of Mercia in Brycheiniog, destroying them.
- 1052 Gruffudd ap Llywelyn invades Herefordshire and sacks Leominster.
- 1055 Gruffudd ap Llywelyn allies with the exiled Ælfgar, Earl of Mercia and ravages Herefordshire.
- 1062 Harold Godwinson, the Earl of Wessex and his brother Tostig start a series of campaigns on behalf of the English crown against Gruffudd ap Llywelyn in retaliation for years of border raids. Gruffudd is killed.
- 1067 Bleddyn and Rhiwallon ap Cynfyn, co rulers of Gwynedd, invade Herefordshire in support of Eadric the Wild, an English rebel resisting the Norman Conquest of England.
- 1067 The Norman rulers of England invade the Kingdom of Gwent and drive king Caradog ap Gruffudd into exile.
- 1073 The Normans invade Gwynedd and occupy Arfon.
- 1085 The Normans launch a wholesale invasion of Gwynedd and Powys.
- 1091 The Normans seize some of the lowlands of the kingdom of Morgannwg (formerly Glywysing) driving Iestyn ap Gwrgan into exile.
- 1093 The Normans and their English subjects advance into Brycheiniog and kill Rhys ap Tewdwr, the king of Deheubarth.
- 1094 Aber Llech is the culmination of a national uprising across Wales that drives the Normans back into England with the exception of a few castles. Deheubarth makes territorial gains at the expense of other southern realms.
- 1095 The Normans return but fail to draw the Welsh into battle.
- 1098 The Normans occupy Gwynedd and Anglesey. They withdraw within the year.

== 12th century ==
Civil wars amongst the Anglo-Norman overlords of England allow the Welsh kingdoms space to consolidate their positions. The end of the century sees a resurgent Gwynedd expand at the expense of her neighbours.

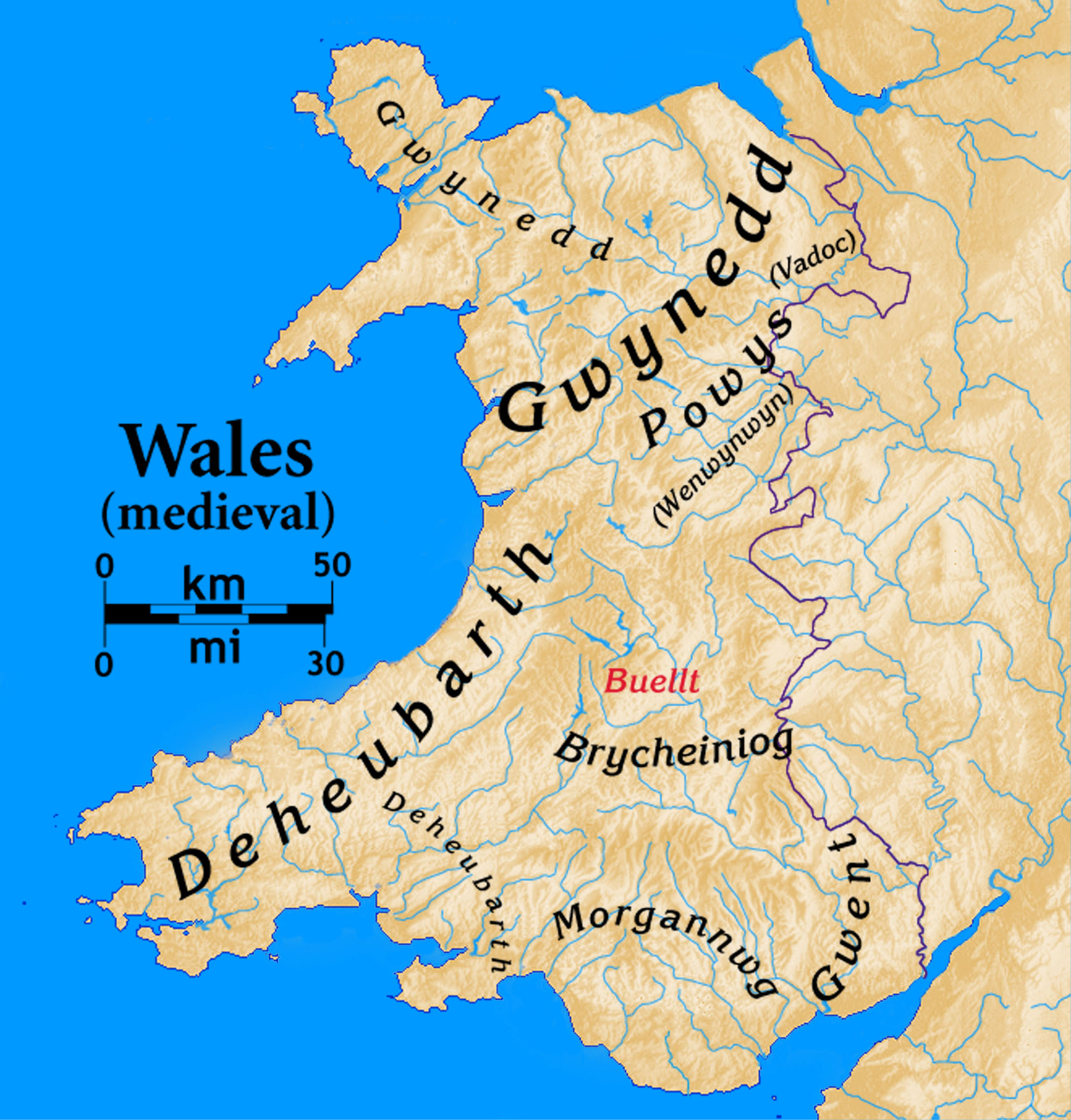

- 1116 The Welsh of Deheubarth revolt against the Norman invaders.
- 1134 Welsh raids into Shropshire destroying Caus Castle.
- 1136 Welsh rise up against the Norman occupying force driving them from all Wales except the Lordship of Carmarthen. Battles of Llwchwr (January) and Crug Mawr (October).
- 1137 An army from Gwynedd captures Carmarthen from the Norman invaders.
- 1141 Battle of Lincoln - A large contingent of Welsh troops led by Madog ap Maredudd, Lord of Powys, and Cadwaladr ap Gruffydd help the Angevin forces depose King Stephen. Following the Battle, Hugh de Mortimer with his cause seeming lost, turned his attention to Fferllys, and invaded its northern parts the following year, killing Cadwgan (and Cadwgan's brother Hywel).
- 1144 The Marcher lord Hugh de Mortimer re-takes Maelienydd.
- 1145 Gilbert de Clare rebuilds Carmarthen Castle.
- 1149 Madog ap Maredudd advances into Shropshire and annexes Oswestry to the kingdom of Powys; it remains in his possession until 1157.
- 1157 Henry II leads a massive invasion of the Perfeddwlad to drive Owain ap Gruffudd, the true king of Gwynedd, away from the border of Cheshire. Following a failed landing on Anglesey, Henry II and Owain come to terms with Owain agreeing to withdraw to the west bank of the River Clwyd.
- 1159 Rhys ap Gruffudd of Deheubarth attacks Anglo-Norman castles and settlements in south Wales, capturing Llandovery in 1162.
- 1163 Henry II launches a military campaign in south Wales invading Deheubarth. He captures Rhys ap Gruffudd at Pencader and takes him to England. Rhys is restored to his lands in 1164 after he agrees to make homage to Henry.
- 1165 Rhys ap Gruffudd leads attacks on Anglo-Norman strongholds in south and west Wales. Gwynedd, Powys, Deheubarth and the smaller realms form an alliance against England. Henry II declares war and leads an invasion force from Shrewsbury through Powys and into Gwynedd. Henry is forced to withdraw, allegedly after adverse weather conditions.
- 1166 Rhys ap Gruffudd captures Cardigan Castle from the Norman crown.
- 1167 Owain ap Gruffudd captures Rhuddlan Castle and Basingwerk advancing as far east as the River Dee.
- 1185 Welsh raiders sack Cardiff.
- 1196 Full-scale war breaks out again. Hubert Walter invades Powys from Shrewsbury and places Welshpool under siege.
- 1198 Battle of Painscastle where a Welsh army is defeated by the Normans.

== 13th century ==
The primacy of Gwynedd continues up to the middle of the century when a "Principality of Wales" is proclaimed by Llywelyn Fawr. After a period of tumult following the death of Llywelyn's successor as prince, Dafydd ap Llywelyn, Dafydd's nephew Llywelyn ap Gruffudd emerges as a major force in Welsh politics, assuming the title of prince of Wales in 1258 and establishing his authority in Powys and Deheubarth. Llywelyn's death in 1282, and the subsequent capture and execution of his brother and successor, Dafydd ap Gruffudd, in 1283 signify the end of Welsh independence. The end of the century sees the annexation of Wales and the Edwardian Settlement.

Wales 1234 (Marchia Wallie and Pura Wallia) Pura Wallia (independent Wales) Lands gained by Llywelyn the Great in 1234 Marchia Wallia (lands ruled by the Marcher barons)

- 1211 The Welsh uprising erupts, King John of England launches an invasion of Gwynedd from Chester but has to retreat without making gains. A second invasion later that year, this time from Shrewsbury, leaves the Welsh town of Bangor in ruins; John succeeds in securing the surrender of the prince of Gwynedd, Llywelyn Fawr, who agrees to cede the Perfeddwlad to the English Crown as part of the peace terms.
- 1215 Llywelyn Fawr in alliance with other princes attacks English holdings across Wales capturing Cardigan Castle, Carmarthen Castle, Kidwelly Castle and many other places. At a Welsh assembly (1216) Llywelyn is, to all intents and purposes, acknowledged as prince of Wales by the noblemen of Powys and Deheubarth. In 1218 the fighting finishes following a peace deal with England.
- 1223 Marcher lord Hubert de Burgh starts a series of campaigns during which he retakes Carmarthen, Cardigan and Montgomery.
- 1240 With Llywelyn Fawr dead the English attack. Marcher lords retake the territorial gains made by Llywelyn.
- 1241 Henry III invades Wales; Dafydd ap Llywelyn is forced to surrender (Aug). The subsequent peace agreement, the Treaty of Gwerneigron, sees the English occupy the Perfeddwlad.
- 1244 Dafydd declares war; several Welsh raids are mounted on the Wales-England border.
- 1245 Dafydd's war intensifies. Gwynedd and her allies in Deheubarth and Powys Fadog make few gains in mid-Wales; however, Mold is recaptured by the Welsh (28 Mar). In August the English attack Gwynedd from Chester; defeated by Dafydd in battle, the invasion force advances as far as Deganwy, where Henry is halted after heavy fighting. In the autumn a truce is agreed, and the English army withdraws to England. Dafydd's death in 1246 precipitates a new attack on Gwynedd from the south by Marcher lord Nicholas de Molis which compels Deheubarth and then Gwynedd to surrender. Under the terms of the Treaty of Woodstock, Gwynedd withdraws from Perfeddwlad.
- 1256 Gwynedd, led by Llywelyn ap Gruffudd, grandson of Llywelyn Fawr, invades and annexes the Perfeddwlad. Gwynedd annexes Brycheiniog, Maelienydd, Gwrtheyrnion and Builth (late 1250s). In order to prevent further invasions by the English crown, Llywelyn agrees to the Treaty of Montgomery (1267) and is acknowledged the Prince of Wales. Deheubarth makes territorial gains in the south.
- 1276 Edward I declares Llywelyn ap Gruffydd an outlaw and invades Wales; English armies from Carmarthen defeat the princes of Deheubarth, armies from Chester overwhelm Powys Fadog and armies from Shrewsbury retake Maelienydd, Builth, Brycheiniog and Gwrtheyrnion. In the 1277 Treaty of Aberconwy Edward forces Llywelyn to cede control of all of Wales but Gwynedd west of the River Conwy. Powys Fadog and Deheubarth are broken up.
- 1282 Dafydd ap Gruffudd, Llywelyn's younger brother, who previously conspired with King Edward I, coordinates a rebellion against England. Llywelyn is eventually drawn into the conflict.
- 1282 The English invade Wales under Edward I. 16 June – Battle of Llandeilo; the Welsh rout an English army in the south, but Edward's forces continue to make slow progress for the rest of the summer. 6 November – Battle of Moel-y-don; the Welsh decisively defeat an English invasion across the Menai Straits. Battle of Orewin Bridge (11 Dec); English forces kill and then behead Llywelyn ap Gruffydd at Cilmeri. Dafydd ap Gruffudd succeeds him.
- 1283 King Edward's forces capture the remaining castles in Gwynedd. The royal court of Wales withdraws to shelter in the mountains. English forces capture Dafydd ap Gruffudd in June and King Edward hangs, draws, and quarters him in Shrewsbury in October, his conquest of Wales complete. Resulting accords leave no part of Wales other than Powys Wenwynwyn, Edeirnion, Glyndyfrdwy and Dryslwyn Castle under native rule as clients of the king.
- 1287 Rhys ap Maredudd of Dryslwyn, a prince of Deheubarth incensed at his treatment by Edward I, whom he previously supported, leads attacks on English holdings in the south taking back the Deheubarth royal centre at Dinefwr and capturing the Ystrad Tywi. By 1288 he has lost all his holdings but remains a guerilla leader until his capture and execution in 1292.
- 1294 Taking advantage of the Anglo French war of 1294-1303 a Welsh uprising led by Madog ap Llywelyn, a junior member of the House of Aberffraw with estates in Anglesey sweeps north and central Wales briefly capturing Castell y Bere, Carnarvon Castle, Cardigan Castle, Dinas Bran and Denbigh Castle among others. Madog proclaims himself prince of Wales.
- 1295 Battle of Maes Moydog (5 Mar); Madog is defeated and the Welsh army destroyed. Madog is soon captured and imprisoned.

== 14th century ==
A period of relative stability under English rule, punctuated by two significant revolts.

- 1314 Revolt breaks out in Glamorgan.
- 1316: uprising in Gwent and Morgannwg led by Llywelyn Bren, the lord of Senghennydd and a descendant of the kings of Morgannwg. Rebels put Caerphilly Castle under siege for six weeks and burn the town. Llywelyn's forces are defeated; he is captured and executed.
- 1326 King Edward II is captured by rebels at Pantybrad after fleeing to South Wales.
- 1345 an uprising in Gwynedd known as the Saint Valentine's Day Massacre when Henry de Shaldeforde, the king of England's attorney and his men were ambushed and slaughtered by Welsh rebels. Anti-English rioting had begun earlier in 1344 centred at Rhuddlan.
- 1369 Owain Lawgoch launches an unsuccessful invasion attempt on Wales.
- 1372 Owain announces his intention of claiming the throne of Wales; he and his forces arrive in Guernsey.
- 1377 Owain plans another invasion with the aid of Castile, resulting in the English sending an assassin after Owain. Owain is assassinated in 1378.

== 15th century ==
Civil conflict in England and the deposition of Richard II are the background for the national uprising led by Owain Glyndŵr who is successful in liberating all of Wales from the English. He is eventually defeated and English control of Wales is reimposed.

- 1400 The Welsh Revolt erupts in Powys Fadog led by Owain Glyndŵr, a nobleman of the house of Powys. Owain proclaims himself prince of Wales (16 Sep) and raids towns in north-east Wales (late Sep); after a few months of inactivity; the revolt spreads across Gwynedd.
- 1401 Conwy Castle is captured by Owain's men. The Battle of Tuthill ends inconclusively during a siege of Caernarfon Castle.
- 1402 Battle of Bryn Glas; Owain defeats the English led by Marcher lord Edmund Mortimer who is captured and later allies with him. The English are driven from Wales.
- 1405 The English launch multiple attacks on Wales retaking many captured castles. In August, Owain leads a combined Franco-Welsh army into England, and reaches as far as Woodbury Hill before retreating.
- 1409 Harlech Castle, Owain's last stronghold, falls to the English. Edmund Mortimer is killed. Owain leads guerilla raids across Wales and is never captured; he is believed to have died around 1415. Maredudd ab Owain Glyndŵr accepts a royal pardon in 1421.

== See also ==
- History of England
- History of Wales
