= Cynan ap Maredudd =

A leader of the Welsh revolt of 1294–1295

Cynan ap Maredudd (died 1295) was a Welsh nobleman who assumed leadership of the Welsh revolt of Madog ap Llywelyn in mid-Wales in 1294 and 1295.

He is recorded in the Welsh chronicle Brut y Tywysogyon as having jointly led the revolt in Deheubarth (south Wales) with Maelgwn ap Rhys, but this seems unlikely, as his known activities were confined to territories well to the north of those of Maelgwn. He is known to have besieged Builth Castle, and also attacked the castle at Cefnllys. After the collapse of the revolt in the summer of 1295, he was captured, apparently at Hereford, and executed at Shrewsbury.
