= Welsh rebellions against English rule =

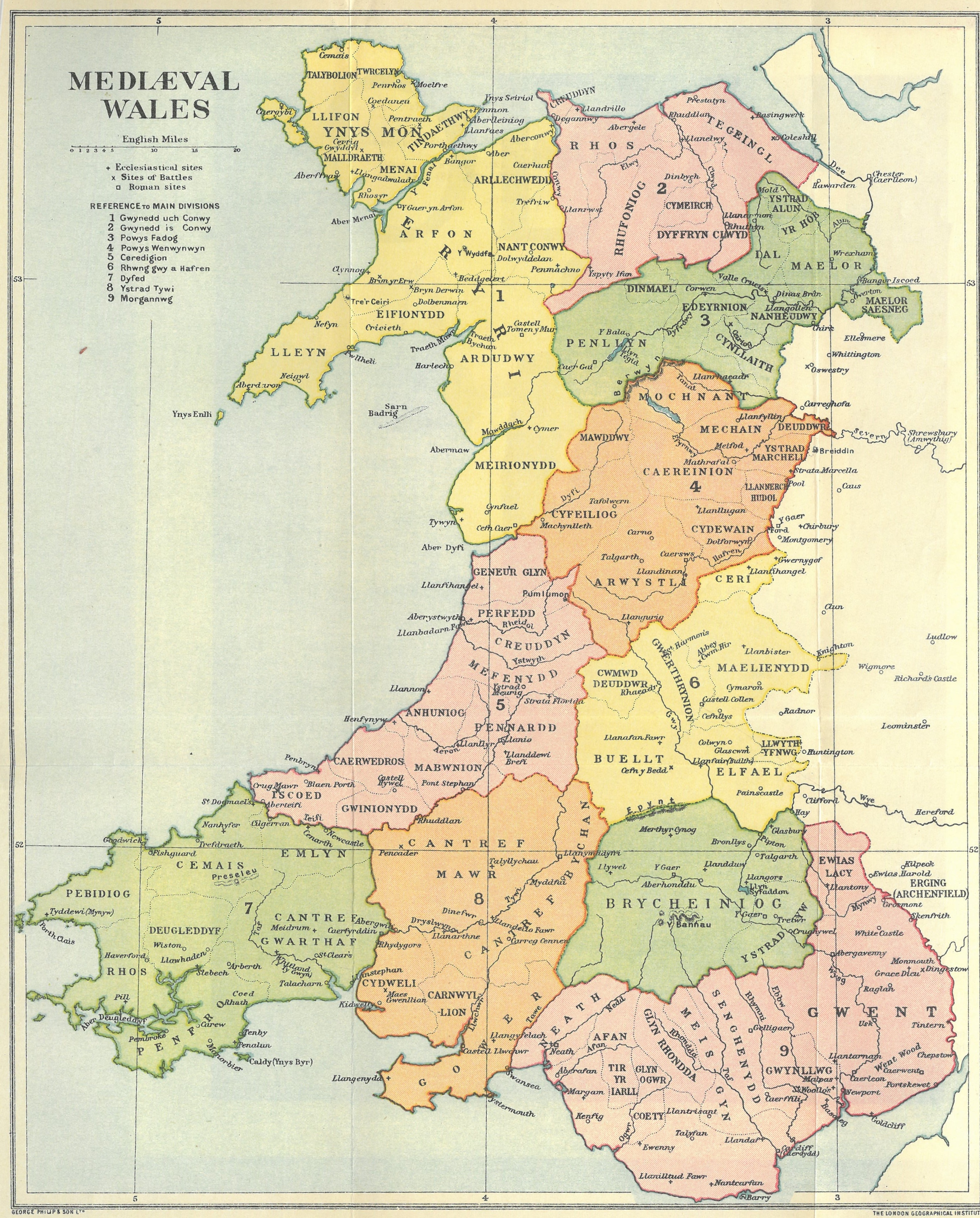
Medieval Wales map

During the late Middle Ages in medieval Wales, rebellions were instigated by the Welsh people in a series of battles and wars before and after the 13th century conquest of Wales by Edward I. By 1283, the whole of Wales was under the control of the Kingdom of England for the first time. Then, by 1400, after centuries of intermittent warfare in Wales, the discontent of the Welsh people with English rule in Wales culminated in the Welsh Revolt, a major uprising led by Owain Glyndŵr, who achieved de facto control over much of the country in the following years. The rebellion petered out after 1409, and after complete English control was restored in 1415, there were no further major rebellions against England in the former Kingdoms in Wales.

== Late Medieval Welsh rebellions ==
Medieval kingdoms in Wales had seen rebellions as a direct consequence of the Norman invasion of Wales. By the 1080s, Wales had become fragmented, and the English kings took full advantage of the situation, launching 21 royal expeditions between 1081 and 1267. The introduction of Marcher lords by the Normans saw the dismantling of kingdoms in Wales. Then King Edward I of England introduced his son as the newly crowned Prince of Wales in 1301. This was seen as an extreme provocation against the Welsh people. Then a century later, Henry V of England was bestowed the title by his father, Henry IV of England in 1399, which is seen as a contributing factor to Owain Glyndwr's proclamation of this title, and subsequent rebellion from 1400.

=== Princes of Aberffraw, 1218–83 ===
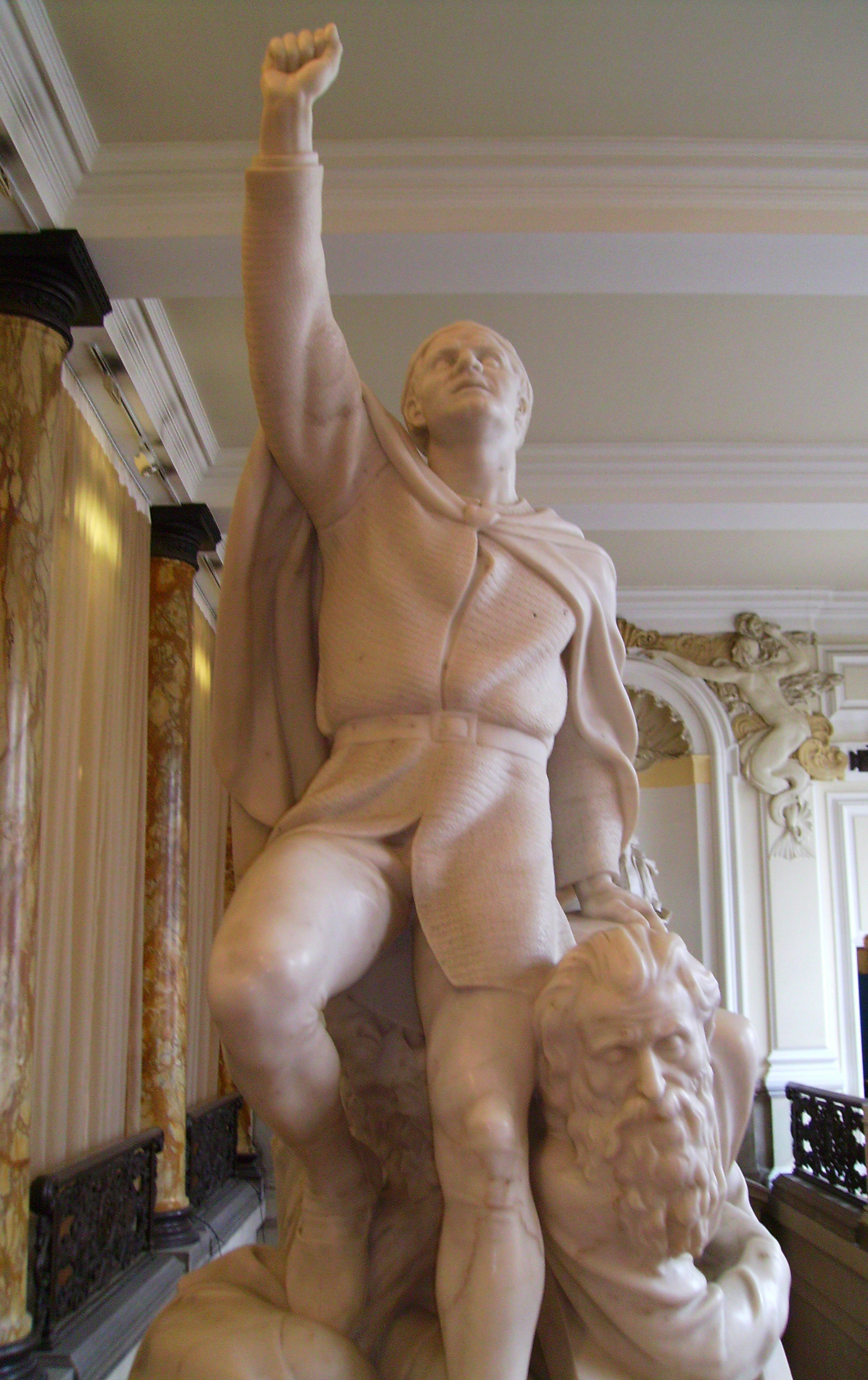
Llywelyn the Last marble statue, City Hall, Cardiff.

Llywelyn ab Iorwerth (Llywelyn the Great), Prince of Aberffraw was the first ruler to unite Wales, forcing other Welsh princes to submit to him, and in 1218 Henry III of England formally recognised him as Prince of Wales in the Treaty of Worcester. However, his son Dafydd ap Llywelyn gave up all his lands outside Gwynedd. It was left for his nephew, Llywelyn ap Gruffudd, to reunite Wales once more under his reign. He ruled from 1246–1282, and used the title Prince of Wales from 1258 with Scottish recognition.

In November 1276, Edward I of England declared war on Llywelyn ap Gruffudd over a series of disputes, and in 1277 led 15,500 men into Wales. Realising his position was hopeless, Llywelyn surrendered without battle. Edward negotiated a settlement, rather than a conquest. War broke out again in 1282, as a result of a rebellion by Llywelyn's brother Dafydd ap Gruffydd, who was discontented with the reward he had received from Edward in 1277. Edward I was sucked into war again, and this time he turned to a war of conquest.

The war turned in Edward's favour when Llywelyn ap Gruffudd unexpectedly marched out of North Wales towards Builth in mid-Wales, where he was killed at the Battle of Orewin Bridge on 11 December 1282. Dafydd took over leadership of the Welsh force, but was caught in 1283. He was dragged through the streets of Shrewsbury by a horse, hanged, drawn and quartered.

Following the deaths of Llywelyn and Dafydd, Edward ended Welsh independence, introducing the royal ordinance of the Statute of Rhuddlan in 1284. The statute was a constitutional change annexing the Principality of Wales to the Realm of England. The statute introduced English common law to Wales for criminal cases, while civil cases were still dealt with under the Welsh laws of Hywel Dda.

=== Rhys ap Maredudd, 1277–78 ===
Rhys ap Maredudd was the great-grandson of The Lord Rhys and he led a Welsh revolt in south Wales in 1287–88.

In 1277, Rhys ap Maredudd submitted to English king Edward I, and surrendered the castle of Dinefwr, but was allowed to retain Dryslwyn. In 1282 Llywelyn ap Gruffydd presented "grievances" on behalf of Rhys against the royal officers in west Wales. Rhys abstained from the revolt in West Wales and assisted Edward in attacking Llanbadarn and patrolling Ceredigion on behalf of the English king in the absence of the royal commander.

After 1283 Rhys was recognized as dominus de Estretewy and granted homage of Welsh chieftains in north Carmarthenshire. He married Ada de Hastings in 1285, receiving the castle of Newcastle Emlyn. He revolted against Edward, 8 June 1287 in Iscennen expelling Giffard; he continued across west Wales to Llanbadarn and possibly Brycheiniog. The regent directed royal troops to Dryslwyn, which was taken from Rhys around 5 September and eventually Newcastle Emlyn on 20 January 1288. He was on the run in 1289 and a writ wrote that he was likely to attempt an escape to Ireland. Rhys was eventually caught and executed in 1292 at York.

=== Madog ap Llywelyn, 1294–95 ===
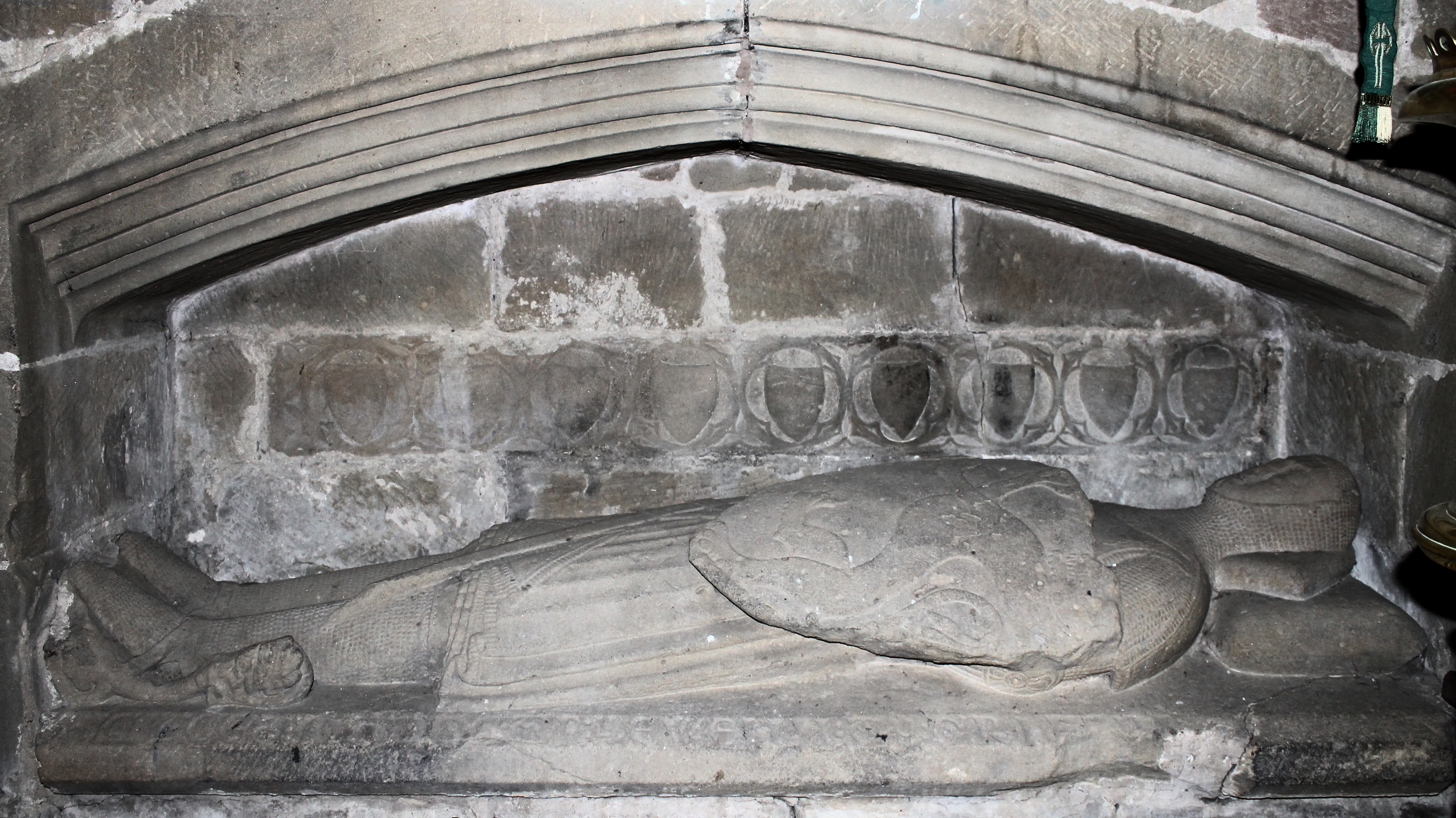
Stone memorial to Madog ap Llywelyn at All Saints' Church, Gresford, Wales. He died in 1331. A Welsh document describes him as "the best man that ever was in Maelor Gymraeg"

Madog ap Llywelyn, the then heir of Lord of Merioneth (Merionethshire) led a Welsh revolt in 1294–95 against English rule in Wales, and was proclaimed "Prince of Wales". On (29 September) 1294, Madog put himself at the head of a national revolt. The revolt was a response to new royal administrators in north and west Wales and the imposition of taxes such as that levied on one fifteenth of all movables. As a royal prince descended directly from Owain Gwynedd and a distant cousin of the last Prince of Aberffraw (Dafydd ap Gruffudd, the executed brother of Llywelyn), Madog declared himself to be the lawful successor and assumed the royal titles of his predecessors including that of Prince of Wales (an example of which can be seen in the so-called Penmachno Document). The uprising had been planned for months and attacks occurred on the same day across Wales. While Madog acted in the north, the attacks in mid and south Wales were led by Cynan ap Maredudd, Maelgwn ap Rhys, and Morgan ap Maredudd of Gwynllwg in Glamorgan. The rebel leaders hoped that by the end of September King Edward and most of his forces would be in France on a planned campaign. However, due to bad weather Edward's army had not yet sailed and he quickly cancelled the French campaign to deal with the Welsh uprising.

In December 1294 King Edward led an army into north Wales to quell the revolt, stopping at Wrexham, Denbigh, Abergele, and elsewhere on his way to Conwy Castle, which he reached shortly before Christmas. His campaign was timely, for several castles remained in serious danger: Harlech Castle was defended at one point by just 37 men. Edward himself was ambushed and retreated to Conwy Castle, losing his baggage train. The town of Conwy was burnt down and Edward besieged until he was relieved by his navy in 1295.

The crucial battle between Madog's men and those of the English crown was the Battle of Maes Moydog in Powys on 5 March 1295. Surprised by an army led by the Earl of Warwick, the Welsh army regained their composure and successfully defended against an English cavalry charge by using the "porcupine" pike men formation, or schiltron, a formation favoured by the Scots armies against English knights. However, arrows from English archers inflicted heavy losses, and in a pursuit of the Welsh from the battlefield, many Welsh soldiers drowned trying to cross a swollen river. Madog barely escaped from this episode with his life and was a fugitive until his capture by Ynyr Fychan of Nannau and was handed over to John de Havering in Snowdonia in late July or early August 1295.

=== Llywelyn Bren, 1316–17 ===
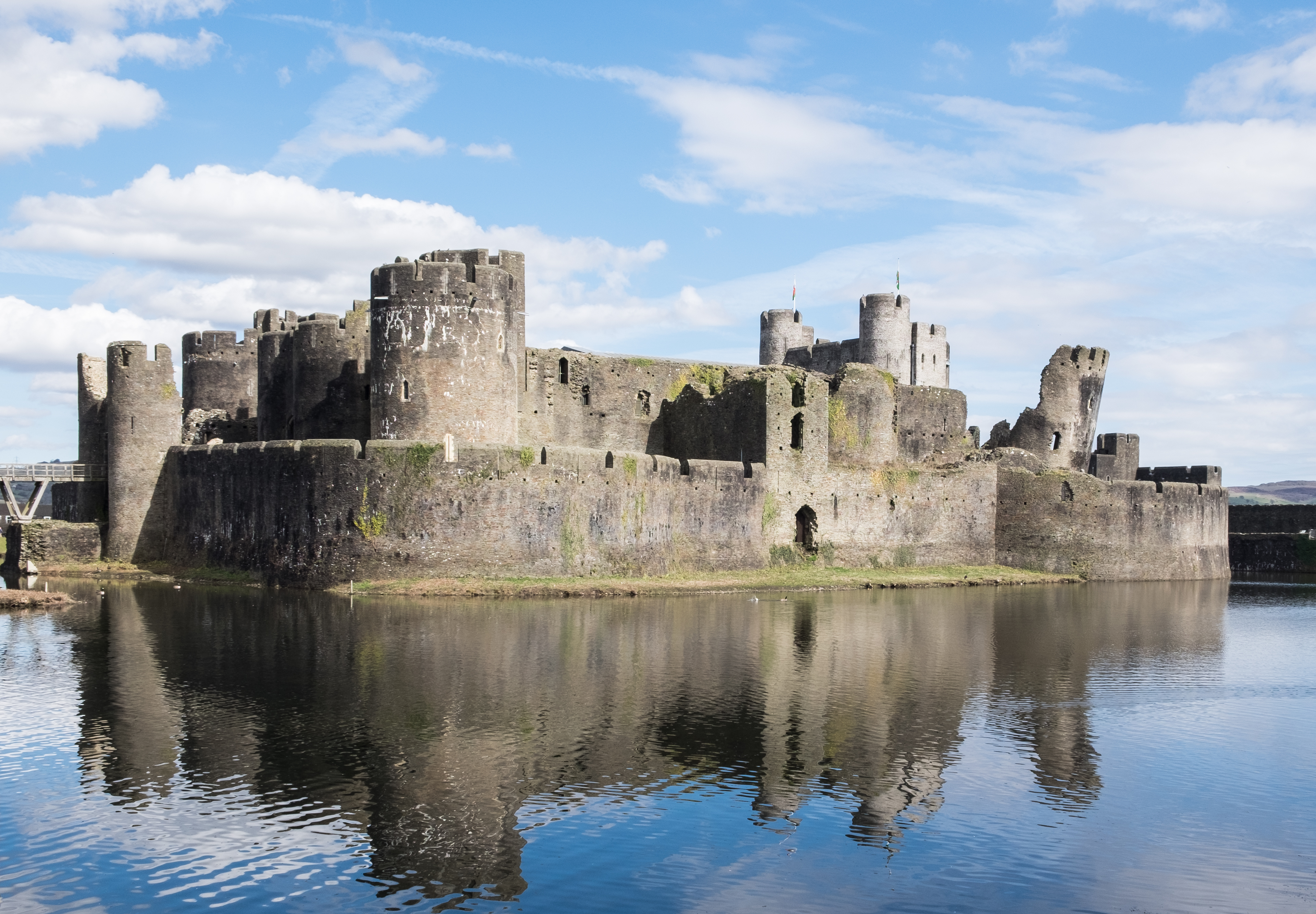
Caerphilly Castle

Llywelyn Bren was a nobleman who led a 1316 revolt in Wales in the reign of King Edward II of England. When he was commanded to appear before the king, Llywelyn raised an army of Welsh Glamorgan men which laid siege to Caerphilly Castle. The rebellion spread throughout the south Wales valleys and other castles were attacked, but this uprising only lasted a few weeks. It marked the last serious challenge to English rule in Wales until the attempts of Owain Lawgoch to invade with French support in the 1370s. Hugh Despenser the Younger's unlawful execution of Llywelyn Bren helped to lead to the eventual overthrow of both Edward II and Hugh.

=== Owain Lawgoch, 1372–78 ===
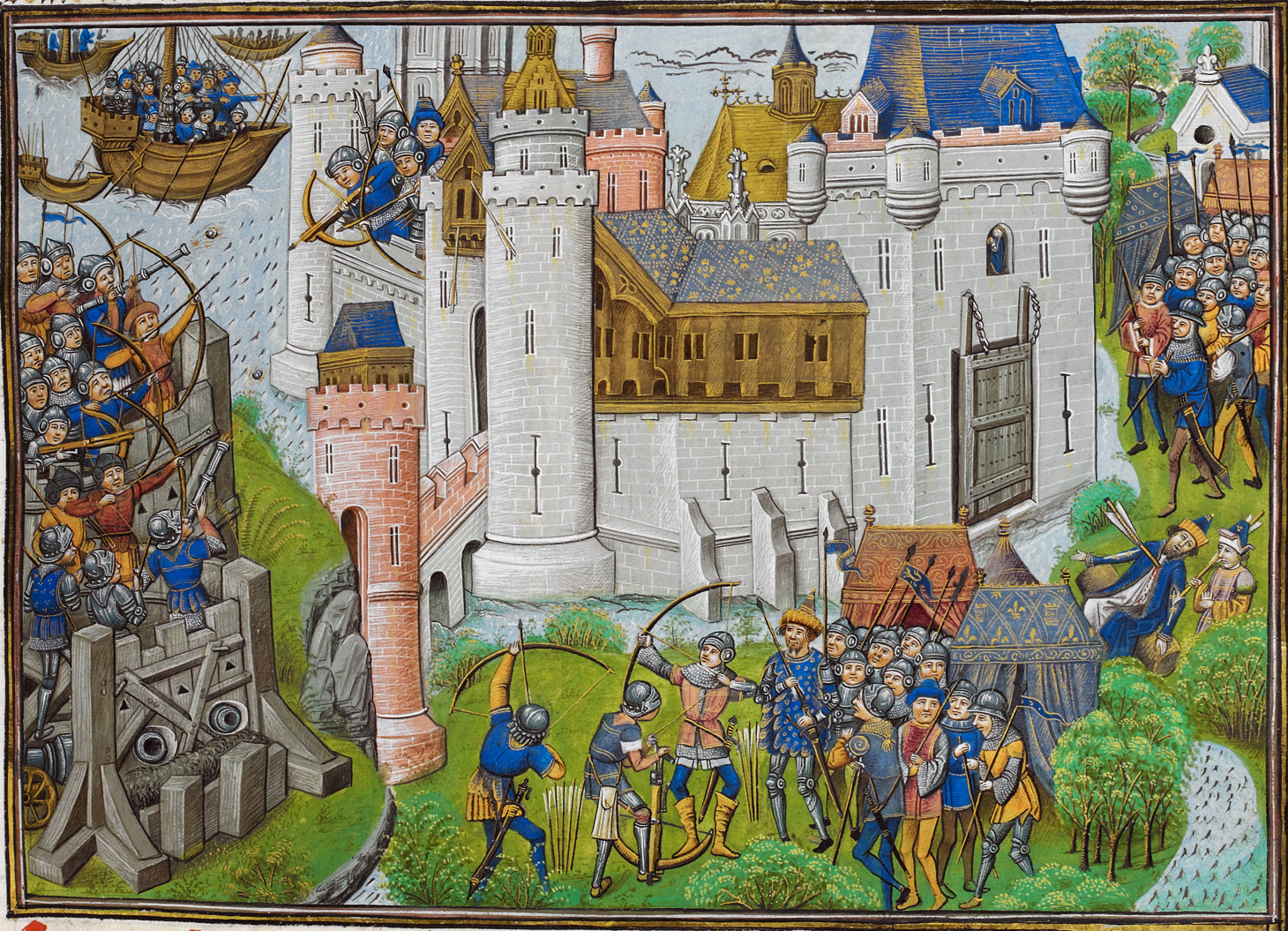
A depiction of Owain's death at Mortagne from a medieval manuscript. Owain is pictured as killed by an arrow, rather than by an assassin' knife.

In May 1372 in Paris, Owain Lawgoch (English: Owen with the red hand) announced that he intended to claim the throne of Wales. Owain set sail from Harfleur with money borrowed from Charles V. Owain first attacked the island of Guernsey, and was still there when a message arrived from Charles ordering him to abandon the expedition in order to go to Castile to seek ships to attack La Rochelle.

In 1377 there were reports that Owain was planning another expedition, this time with help from Castile. The alarmed English government sent a spy, the Scot John Lamb, to assassinate Owain, who had been given the task of besieging Mortagne-sur-Gironde in Poitou. Lamb gained Owain's confidence and stabbed Owain to death in July 1378, something Walker described as 'a sad end to a flamboyant career'. The Issue Roll of the Exchequer dated 4 December 1378 records "To John Lamb, an esquire from Scotland, because he lately killed Owynn de Gales, a rebel and enemy of the King in France ... £20". Owain was buried at the Church of St. Leger, near Cognac, France.

With the assassination of Owain Lawgoch the senior line of the House of Aberffraw became extinct. As a result, the claim to the title 'Prince of Wales' fell to the other royal dynasties, of Deheubarth and Powys. The leading heir in this respect was Owain Glyndŵr, who was descended from both dynasties.

=== Owain Glyndŵr, 1400–16 ===
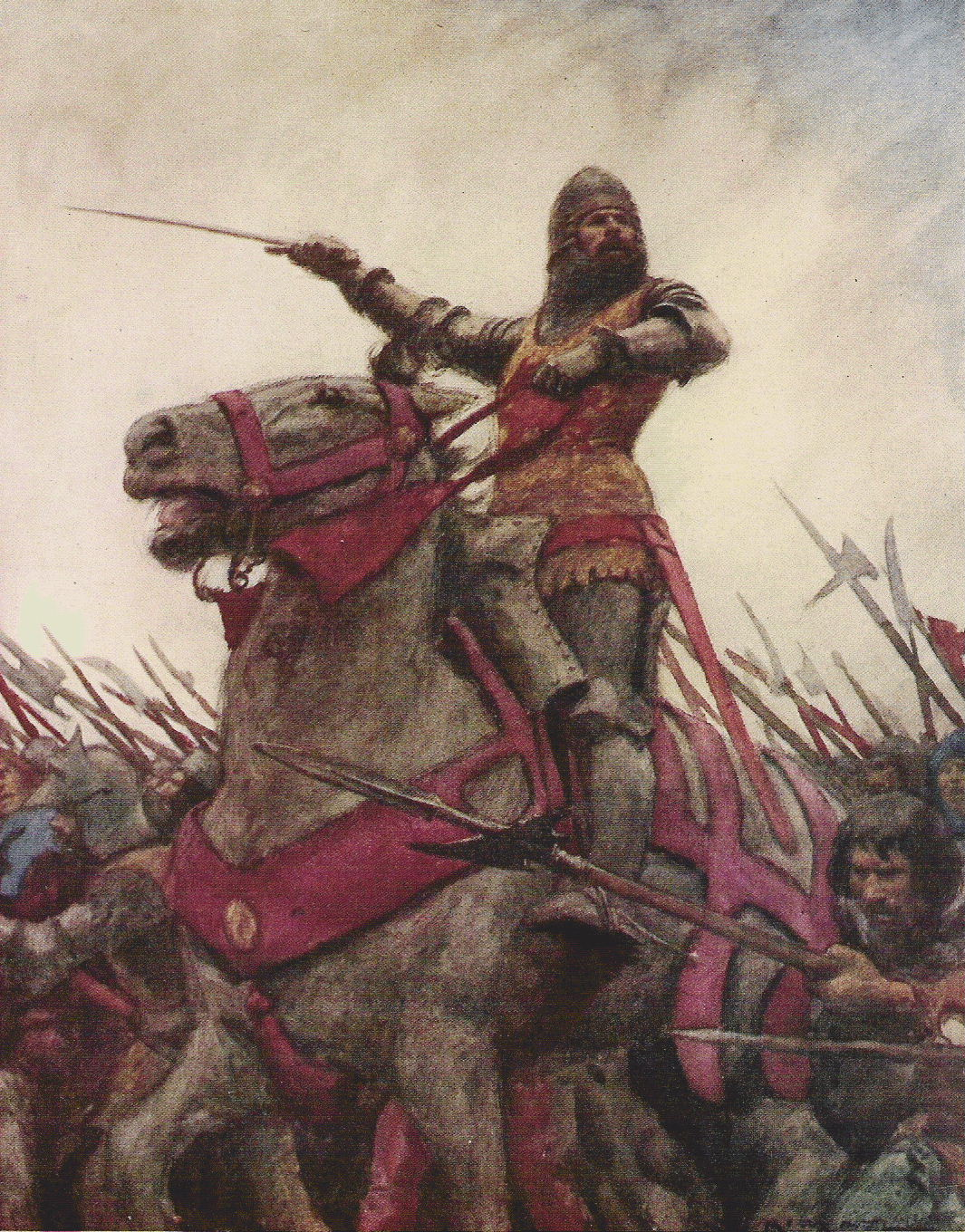
Painting of Owain Glyndŵr by A. C. Michael

The immediate and initial cause of Owain Glyndŵr's rebellion is likely the incursion onto his land by Baron Grey of Ruthin and the late delivery of a letter requiring Glyndŵr to provide armed services to King Henry IV of England, as well as unfair mediation of this dispute by the English king. Glyndŵr was pronounced Prince of Wales in Glyndyfrdwy in September 1400; and with his armies he proceeded to attack English towns in north-east Wales with guerilla tactics, disappearing into the mountains. Allies of Glyndŵr, the Tudor family then captured Conwy Castle at Easter 1401. He gathered much support across Wales while King Henry led several attempted invasions of Wales but with limited success. Bad weather and the guerilla tactics of Glyndŵr created a mythical status for him, a man at one with the elements who had control over the weather.

The immediate response of the English was to pass a series of coercive and discriminatory laws in 1401 and 1402, designed to quell the rebellion. These laws imposed punitive sanctions against the Welsh and asserted English dominance in Wales. The laws failed in their immediate effect as the resentment they caused drove up the numbers taking up arms.

Arms of Owain Glyndwr (and Owain Lawgoch)

In 1404, Glyndŵr captured Aberystwyth and Harlech castles, formed an agreement with the French and held a Senedd at Machynlleth. He held court in Harlech Castle to watch him sign his letters patent with a seal to be sent to Charles VI of France, the seal indent wrote that he was crowned Prince of Wales written in Latin, French assistance arrived in 1405, and much of Wales was in Glyndŵr's control. In 1406 Glyndŵr wrote the Pennal Letter at Pennal near Machynlleth, offering Welsh allegiance to the Avignon Antipope Benedict XIII, rather than the Rome Pope and seeking recognition of St David as the seat of the bishop of Wales, clerics fluent in Welsh, two Welsh universities, retention of Welsh Church revenues and that the "usurper" Henry IV should be excommunicated. The French did not respond and the rebellion began to falter. Aberystwyth Castle was lost in 1408 and Harlech Castle in 1409; and Glyndŵr was forced to retreat to the Welsh mountains, from where he continued occasional guerilla raids. It is likely that he died in 1416 at Kentchurch at the Anglo-Welsh border at the home of his daughter Alys.

His legacy at the time was the penal laws, which remained in force long after the rebellion. Although never consistently enforced, they made the Welsh second class citizens in their own nation, until they were abolished by the Laws in Wales Acts 1535 and 1542. With hopes of independence ended, there were no further wars or rebellions against English colonial rule.

== See also ==
- Wales in the Middle Ages
- List of Anglo-Welsh wars
- Welsh Revolt
- Wars of Scottish Independence
- Irish War of Independence

== Bibliography ==
- Carr, Anthony D. (1995). Medieval Wales. Basingstoke: Macmillan. ISBN 0312125097.
- Davies, Rees R. (2000). The Age of Conquest: Wales 1063–1415 (2 ed.). Oxford: Oxford University Press. ISBN 0198208782.
- Davies, R. R.; Morgan, Gerald (2009). Owain Glyn Dŵr: Prince of Wales. Ceredigion: Y Lolfa. ISBN 978-1-84771-127-4.
- Evans, Gywnfor (1992). Land of my Fathers. Y Lolfa.
- Griffiths, John (1955). "The Revolt of Madog ap Llywelyn, 1294–5". Transactions of the Caernarfonshire Historical Society. 16: 12–24.
- Griffiths, R. A. (1966). "The Revolt of Rhys ap Maredudd, 1287-88". Welsh History Review. 3 (2): 121–143 – via The National Library of Wales.
- Jenkins, Geraint H. (2007). A Concise History of Wales. Cambridge University Press. ISBN 978-0-521-82367-8.
- Jenkins, Robert Thomas (1959). "RHYS ap MAREDUDD (died 1292), lord of Dryslwyn in Ystrad Tywi". Dictionary of Welsh Biography. National Library of Wales.
- Jones, Craig Owen (2007). Compact History of Welsh Heroes: Llywelyn Bren. Llanrwst: Gwasg Carreg Gwalch. ISBN 978-1845270988.
- Jones, Craig Owen (2008). Compact History of Welsh Heroes: The Revolt of Madog ap Llywelyn. Gwalch.
- Jones, Francis (1969). The Princes and Principality of Wales. University of Wales Press. ISBN 9780900768200.
- Long, Tony (2007). "Oct. 3, 1283: As Bad Deaths Go, It's Hard to Top This". Wired. ISSN 1059-1028.
- Moore, David (10 January 2007). The Welsh Wars of Independence. The History Press. ISBN 978-0-7524-9648-1.
- Pierce, Thomas Jones (1959a). "LLYWELYN ap GRUFFYDD or LLYWELYN BREN (died 1317) nobleman, soldier and rebel martyr". Dictionary of Welsh Biography. National Library of Wales.
- Pierce, Thomas Jones (1959b). "Llywelyn ap Iorwerth ('Llywelyn the Great', often styled 'Llywelyn I', prince of Gwynedd)". Dictionary of Welsh Biography. National Library of Wales.
- Pierce, Thomas Jones (1959c). "MADOG ap LLYWELYN, rebel of 1294". Dictionary of Welsh Biography. National Library of Wales.
- Pierce, Thomas Jones (1959d). "OWAIN ap THOMAS ap RHODRI (' Owain Lawgoch '; died 1378), a soldier of fortune and pretender to the principality of Wales". Dictionary of Welsh Biography. National Library of Wales.
- Pilkington, Colin (2002). Devolution in Britain today. Manchester University Press. pp. 23–24. ISBN 978-0-7190-6075-5.
- Powicke, F. M. (1970) [1st Pub. 1962]. The Thirteenth Century: 1216–1307 (2nd ed.). Oxford: Clarendon Press. ISBN 978-0-19-82-1708-4.
- Prestwich, Michael (2007). Plantagenet England: 1225–1360 (new ed.). Oxford: Oxford University Press. ISBN 978-0-19-822844-8.
- "The National Archives - Exhibitions - Uniting the Kingdoms?". The National Archives.
- "Owain Lawgoch". owain-glyndwr.wales.
- The transactions of the Honourable Society of Cymmrodorion 1899-1900. London: The Society of Cymmrodorion. 1900.
- Turvey, Roger (2010). Twenty-One Welsh Princes. Conwy: Gwasg Carreg Gwalch. ISBN 9781845272692. OCLC 657181335.
- Walker, David (1990). Medieval Wales. Cambridge University Press. p. 139. ISBN 978-0-521-31153-3.
- Williams, Glanmor (1993). Renewal and Reformation: Wales C. 1415-1642. Oxford University Press. ISBN 9780192852779.
