= Welsh uprising of 1211 =

Military conflict

Welsh Rebellion of 1211
- Part of List of Anglo-Welsh wars
Date	August 1211
Location	Wales
Result	English victory Peace treaty with King John

Belligerents
Kingdom of Gwynedd; Kingdom of Deheubarth	Kingdom of England

Commanders and leaders
Llywelyn ab Iorwerth; William de Braose, 4th Lord of Bramber; Robert of Shrewsbury	King John; Ranulf de Blondeville, 6th Earl of Chester; Madog ap Gruffydd Maelor; Peter des Roches; Thomas Moulton (knight)

The Welsh Rebellion of 1211 was a rebellion by several Welsh princes, orchestrated by Llywelyn ab Iorwerth with primary support from Gwenwynwyn ab Owain Cyfeiliog, Maelgwn ap Rhys, and Madog ap Gruffudd Maelor, against King John of England. Although Llywelyn was tactically defeated and forced to sue for peace, this uprising resulted in increased independence from England for the Welsh.

== Background ==
In the Norman Conquest of 1066, the Norman army of William the Conqueror conquered England, and English earldoms of Chester, Shrewsbury, and Hereford were created on England's border with Wales. These strategic political centres served as key points in military action against the Welsh. Despite the strategic advantage these areas gave the Normans, only one Welsh kingdom fell under Norman control during William's reign: the southeast Kingdom of Gwent.

By 1100, areas controlled by Norman lords included Brecon, Cardigan, Glamorgan and Pembroke. This led to the establishment of the March of Wales, an area previously ruled by Welsh kings.

In the 12th century, the Welsh resisted Norman control. The kingdoms of Deheubarth, Gwynedd and Powys became a firmly established base for Welsh statehood. Aberffraw (Gwynedd), Dinefwr (Deheubarth), and Mathrafal (Powys) had become the centres of Welsh culture and politics. The establishment of these kingdoms started a period of stability and growth for the Welsh, including flourishing agriculture, scholarship and Welsh literature. The Welsh lacked strength as an entity, however, because although allies, the Welsh kings ruled separately, and swore allegiance to England's crown.

== Uprising ==
The end of the 12th century marked a period of political unrest due to the contested succession following the deaths of the three Welsh kings. Several factions fought for control of the region. Deheubarth and Powys never returned to stability, but Gwynedd was once again united under the reign of Llywelyn ap Iorwerth (Llywelyn Fawr, "the Great"), following a rather brief power struggle.

King John was unsettled by the new power gained by Llywelyn, and so he led a military campaign against him which led to Llywelyn's defeat in 1211. Llywelyn, although humiliated, did secure the allegiance of other Welsh leaders, since the Welsh feared total subjugation under King John. Llywelyn led Welsh forces through continued conflict with King John, and successfully united the Welsh politically. As a result, John and Llywelyn reached an agreement, and a peace treaty was signed in July 1211, but only after Joan, Lady of Wales, Llywelyn's wife, who was also the illegitimate daughter of King John, intervened as a diplomat for her husband. This provided for minimal involvement by the king of England in Welsh affairs.

== Bibliography ==
- Caradoc of Llancarvan; Williams, John, Brut y Tywysogion or The Chronicle of the Welsh Princes. Longman and Roberts, London, 1860, p. 271.
