= Madog ap Llywelyn =

Leader of the Welsh revolt of 1294–1295

Prince of Wales
- Pretence: 1294–1295
- Predecessor: Dafydd ap Gruffudd
- Successor: Owain Lawgoch
- Died: After 1305; Tower of London, England
- Issue: Maredudd ap Madog; Hywel ap Madog
- Dynasty: Second Dynasty of Gwynedd
- Military career
- Conflicts Battles: Welsh revolt of 1294–95 Battle of Maes Moydog
- Father: Llywelyn ap Maredudd

Madog ap Llywelyn (died after 1305) was the leader of the Welsh revolt of 1294–95 against English rule in Wales. The revolt was surpassed in longevity only by the revolt of Owain Glyndŵr in the 15th century. Madog belonged to a junior branch of the House of Aberffraw and was a distant relation of Llywelyn ap Gruffudd, the last recognised native Prince of Wales. During his revolt, Madog issued a land grant in which he used the title "Prince of Wales".

== Lineage ==
Madog was the son of Llywelyn ap Maredudd, the last vassal Lord of Meirionydd who had been deprived of his patrimony in 1256 for opposing the future Prince of Wales, Llywelyn ap Gruffudd, at the Battle of Bryn Derwin. Llywelyn ap Maredudd had gone into exile in England where he received a pension from the English crown, until June 1262 when he reconciled with Llywelyn ap Gruffudd. He died in a skirmish fighting for the Welsh in April 1263. His eldest son, Madog, who may have been born in exile, is known to have received substantial monetary gifts from King Edward I of England in 1277, and used this money to sue the Prince of Wales in 1278 in an attempt to have his father's cantref of Meirionydd returned to him. It appears that Madog returned to Gwynedd after the death of Llywelyn ap Gruffudd in 1282, and received lands from the King of England in Anglesey.

== Revolt against King Edward I ==
On Michaelmas (29 September) 1294, Madog put himself at the head of a national revolt in response to the actions of new royal administrators in north and west Wales and the imposition of taxes such as that levied on one fifteenth of all movables. Although there is no evidence that the aim of the rebellion was the re-establishment of the former principality of Wales, he did, in one land grant issued during the rebellion, use the title "Prince of Wales". The uprising had been planned for months and attacks occurred on the same day across Wales. While Madog acted in the north the attacks in mid and south Wales were led by Cynan ap Maredudd, Maelgwn ap Rhys, and Morgan ap Maredudd of Gwynllwg in Glamorgan. The rebel leaders hoped that by the end of September King Edward and most of his forces would be in France on a planned campaign. However, due to bad weather Edward's army had not yet sailed and he quickly cancelled the French campaign to deal with the Welsh uprising.

== Edward's fortresses attacked ==
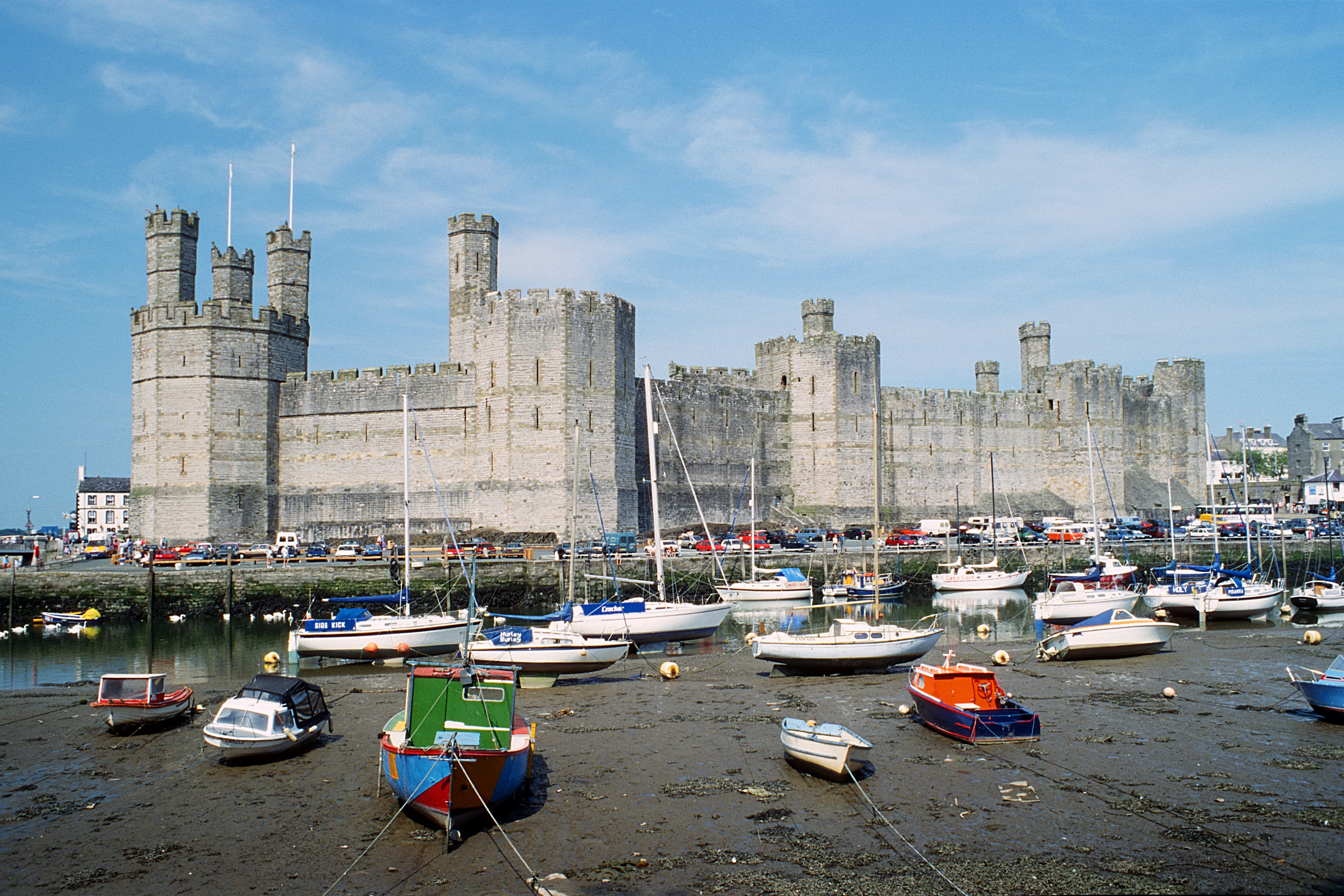
Caernarfon castle

Caernarfon was overrun by Madog's forces and the castle occupied, as were the castles at Castell y Bere (subsequently burnt), Hawarden, Ruthin, and Denbigh. Criccieth Castle was besieged by Madog's forces for several months, as was Harlech. Morlais castle was captured under the aegis of Morgan in the south, and Cynan ap Maredudd besieged the castle at Builth for a period of six weeks. Half the town of Caerphilly was burnt—although the castle itself held out—and, further south, Kenfig Castle was sacked.

In north Wales, attempts were made by many English landowners to retrieve the situation. The lord of Denbigh, Henry de Lacy led a march to Denbigh after the castle there was besieged; however, he was ambushed outside the town on 11 November, and in the ensuing battle his force was routed by the rebels. In north-east Wales, Reginald de Grey was more successful, stationing substantial garrisons at Flint and Rhuddlan—neither castle fell to the rebels, though Flint was subjected to a lengthy siege. Many other castles across Wales were besieged and several towns burnt.

In December 1294 King Edward led an army into north Wales to quell the revolt, stopping at Wrexham, Denbigh, Abergele, and elsewhere on his way to Conwy Castle, which he reached shortly before Christmas. His campaign was timely, for several castles remained in serious danger—Harlech Castle was defended at one point by just 37 men. Edward himself was ambushed and retreated to Conwy Castle, losing his baggage train. The town of Conwy was burnt down and Edward besieged until he was relieved by his navy in 1295.

== Battle of Maes Moydog and defeat ==
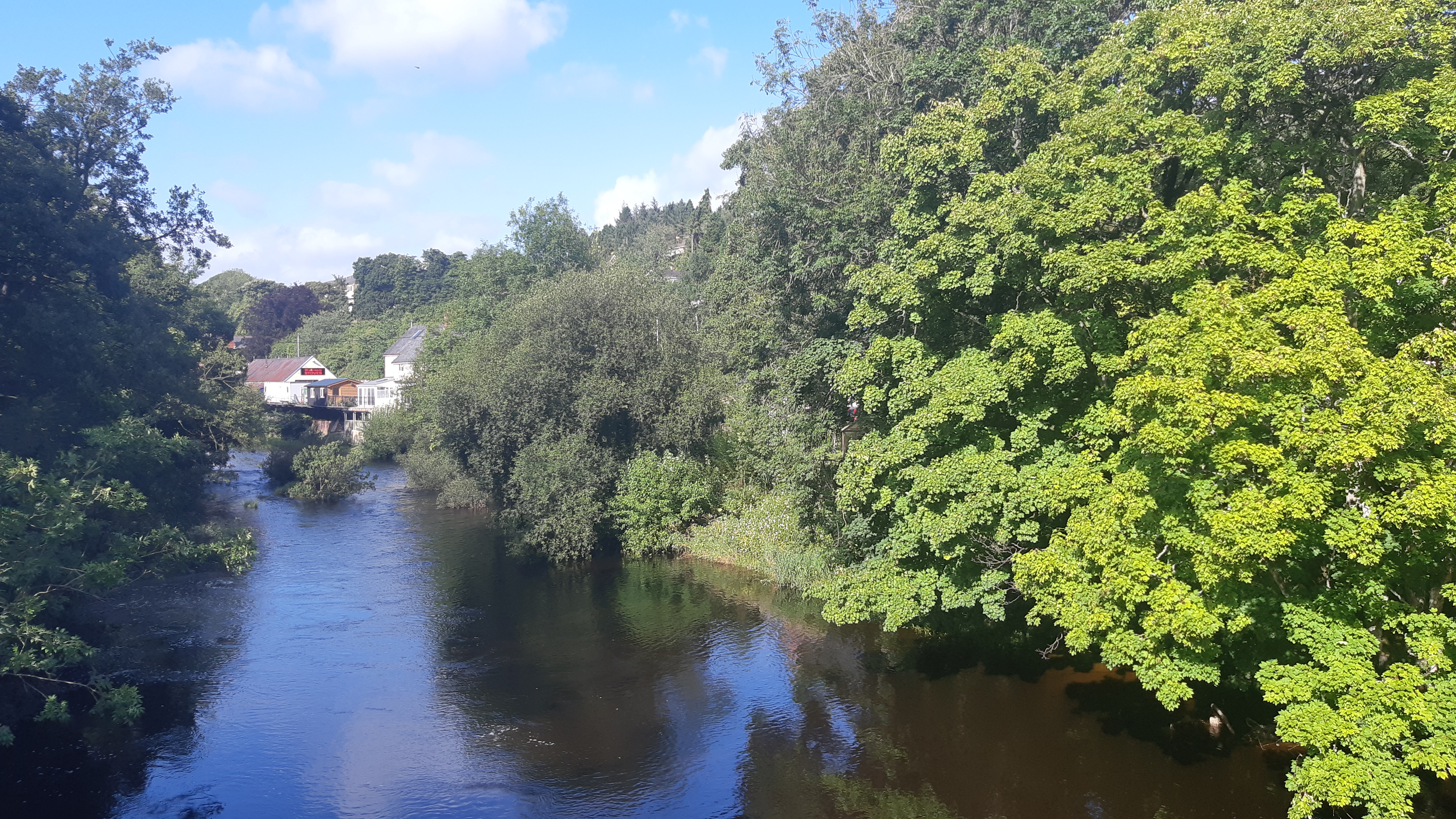
Maes Moydog

The crucial battle between Madog's men and those of the English crown occurred at the battle of Maes Moydog in Powys on 5 March 1295. Surprised by an army led by the Earl of Warwick, the Welsh army regained their composure and successfully defended against an English cavalry charge by using the "porcupine" pike men formation, or schiltron, a formation favoured by the Scots armies against English knights. However, arrows from English archers inflicted heavy losses, and in a pursuit of the Welsh from the battlefield, many Welsh soldiers drowned trying to cross a swollen river.

Madog barely escaped from this episode with his life and was a fugitive until his capture by Ynyr Fychan of Nannau and was handed over to John de Havering in Snowdonia in late July or early August 1295. He was subsequently taken to London, where he seems to have been kept in captivity for the rest of his life; he was still alive in 1305. He was survived by his sons.

The revolt of 1294–95 elicited a harsh response from Edward I in the form of humiliating and punitive ordinances further restricting the civil rights and economic and social opportunities of the Welsh. However, it was not long before Llywelyn Bren, Lord of Senghenydd, led a second rebellion, aided by some of the more prominent Marcher Lords in 1316.

== Issue and succession ==
Madog was not the last of the House of Gwynedd; two sons survived him. Additionally, the children of Rhodri ap Gruffudd, a brother of Llywelyn the Last's, survived in exile. A grandson of Rhodri's, Owain ap Thomas, or Owain Lawgoch, later proclaimed himself Prince of Wales. The sons of Dafydd Goch's may also have laid claim to the title, although illegitimately.

Madog ap Llywelyn is known to have had the following children:

- Maredudd ap Madoc ap Llywelyn (died c. 1334)
- Hywel ap Madoc ap Llywelyn (died c. 1352) who had descendants who got confused on who Madog was and claimed he was an unknown son of Llywelyn the Last as per P.C. Bartrums Welsh genealogies.

== In popular culture ==
The plot of The Bastard Executioner partially involves the fallout from the real-life Welsh revolt of 1294–95 against English rule, led by Madog ap Llywelyn.

The revolt features in the 2010 historical novel Insurrection by Robyn Young.

== Bibliography ==
- Evans, Gywnfor (1992). Land of my Fathers. Y Lolfa.
- Griffiths, John (1955). "The Revolt of Madog ap Llywelyn, 1294–5". Transactions of the Caernarfonshire Historical Society. 16: 12–24.
- Jones, Craig Owen (2008). Compact History of Welsh Heroes: The Revolt of Madog ap Llywelyn. Gwalch.
- Lloyd, John Edward (1911). A history of Wales from the earliest times to the Edwardian conquest. Longmans, Green & Co.
- "Madog ap Llywelyn, rebel of 1294". Dictionary of Welsh Biography. National Library of Wales.
- Smith, J. Beverley (1998). Llywelyn ap Gruffudd, Tywysog Cymru.

== Succession ==
Titles in pretence
Preceded by Dafydd ap Gruffudd (1282–3)	— TITULAR — Prince of Wales; 1294–5	Succeeded by English title: Edward of Carnarvon (1301–07); Welsh pretender: Owain Lawgoch (1363–78)
