= Maelgwn ap Rhys (rebel) =

A leader of the Welsh revolt of 1294–1295

Maelgwn ap Rhys (died 1295, birth unknown) was a rebel and descendant of Maelgwn ap Rhys ap Gruffydd. His father was Rhys Fychan, Geneu'r Glyn's last lord. On 29 September 1294, Madog ap Llywelyn led a national revolt against King Edward's royal administration in north and west Wales. While Madog rebelled in the North, Maelgwn ap Rhys led the revolt in Ceredigion. Maelgwn attempted a siege of Llanbadarn but was unsuccessful. His campaign also involved heavy raids in Pembroke and Carmarthen, until the earl of Gloucester's men killed Maelgwn in 1295 in a fight near Carmarthen. Maelgwn had two brothers, Rhys and Gruffydd, both of whom were imprisoned in Norwich until as late as 1308.
