= Battle of Hehil =

Battle in Cornwall, c. 721–722

Date	c. 721–722
Location	"among the Cornish"
Result	British victory

Belligerents
West Britons	West Saxons (probably)

Casualties and losses
Unknown	Unknown

The Battle of Hehil was a battle won by a force of Britons, probably against the Anglo-Saxons of Wessex around the year 720. The location is unknown, except that it was apud Cornuenses ("among the Cornish").

== Sources ==
The only direct reference to the battle appears in the Annales Cambriae. A translation from the original Latin is as follows:

The battle of Hehil among the Cornish, the battle of Garth Maelog, the battle of Pencon among the South Britons, and the Britons were the victors in those three battles.

The Annales Cambriae are undated but Egerton Phillimore placed the entry in the year 722.

Although the source does not name the Anglo-Saxons as the enemy in any of the three battles, it has been claimed that the failure to specify the enemy was simply because this was so obvious to all, and that any other opponents would have been clearly named.

The battle is not mentioned in the Anglo-Saxon Chronicle, and H. P. R. Finberg has speculated that this is because Wessex was defeated.

== Battlefield ==
The location of Hehil is not known, but many scholars have tried to identify it. In 1916 the Celtic scholar Donald MacKinnon was not willing to say more than that it was on "the Devonian peninsula". In 2003 Christopher Snyder simply stated that "722 The Annales Cambriae record a British victory at Hehil in Cornwall".

Based simply on the place name, Frank Stenton suggested that the battle was at Hayle in west Cornwall. In 1987 Leslie Alcock noted that the most obvious interpretation of 'Hehil among the Cornish' is the River Hayle in west Cornwall, but referred to Ekwall's identification of the name with the River Camel, previously known as the Heil, and concluded that this "more easterly attribution may be preferable". Other scholars preferring the River Camel include W. G. Hoskins, who put Hehil at Egloshayle on that river; Leonard Dutton, who suggested in 1993 "at or near the spot where the fifteenth century bridge at Wadebridge crosses the Camel"; and Philip Payton who in 2004 located it "probably [at] the strategically important Camel estuary".

Malcolm Todd took the view in 1987 that these sites were "too far west to be taken seriously", and made two suggestions. The first was Hele at Jacobstow in north Cornwall, a place which had been mentioned as a possibility in 1931 in the introduction to The Place-Names of Devon, and was also supported by the landscape archaeologist Della Hooke in 1994. Todd's other suggestion was Hele in the Culm Valley in east Devon.

In 2022 John Fletcher explained why he thought that the village of Merton, north of Okehampton, has "potentially excellent credentials as the site for the historic Hehil".

== Significance ==
The British victory at Hehil in 722 may have proved decisive in the history of the West Britons: it was not until almost a hundred years later (in 814) that further battles are recorded in the area, a period which Nicholas Orme sees as probably consolidating the division between Cornwall and Devon.

In 2013 T. M. Charles-Edwards, noting that the battle came "not long after Geraint was last attested as king of Dumnonia", suggested that it might indicate that Dumnonia had fallen by 722 and that the victory of Hehil had secured the survival of the kingdom of Cornwall for another 150 years.
