= Battle of Pencon =

Obscure battle fought in southern Wales

Coordinates: 51.9°N 2.8°W

Date	c. 720
Location	Pencoed Glamorgan
Result	Welsh, Glamorgan or Brittonic victory

Belligerents
Britons	Possibly Anglo-Saxons or fellow Britons

Commanders and leaders
Unknown	Unknown

The Battle of Pencon or Pencoed was a battle won by the Britons (modern Welsh), possibly against the Mercians or against themselves, around the year 720.

== Accounts ==
The Chronicle of the Princes places the battle in AD 720. The Annals of Wales are undated but Phillimore placed the following entry in the year 722:

The battle of Hehil among the Cornish, the battle of Garth Maelog, the battle of Pencon among the South Britons, and the Britons were the victors in those three battles.

Although the Annals of Wales does not specifically identify the Anglo-Saxons as the enemy, it is considered that the failure to specify an enemy was simply because it would have been obvious. While other theories suggest the battle could have been between the Welsh and Cornish themselves.

The Chronicle of Princes seems to refute this logic, specifically excluding Pencoed from Rhodri Molwynog's conflict with the Saxons that year:

The same year Rhodri Molwynauc was made king over the Britons, and a great war arose between him and the Saxons, during which the Britons won two battles honorably. The same year, the battle of Garthmaelawg took place, and another in Gwynedd, and the battle of Pencoed in Glamorganshire; in all which three the Britons conquered.

== Location ==
Castell Pen-y-Coed, an earthwork in Carmarthenshire, Wales has been suggested as the possible site of the battle of Pencon. Another site is next to Coed y Mwstwr (lit. Field of the Muster) and Ogof y Pebyll (caves next the Encampments) at Pencoed, near Bridgend in Glamorgan
