= Battle of Maes Moydog =

Battle in 1295 during the revolt against English rule

Date	5 March 1295
Location	Moydog Fawr 52.66196°N 3.23109°W
Result	English victory

Belligerents
English Crown	Welsh Rebels

Commanders and leaders
William de Beauchamp, 9th Earl of Warwick	Madog ap Llywelyn

Casualties and losses
?	700+

The Battle of Maes Moydog was a decisive victory on 5 March 1295 by the English over the Welsh during Madog ap Llywelyn's 1294-95 rebellion. A force of Edward I's army led by William de Beauchamp, 9th Earl of Warwick surprised Madog and his men while they camped in the field of Moydog (Welsh: maes Moydog), probably Moydog Fawr near Castle Caereinion in Powys. Madog failed to overcome the defeat, and his rebellion ended several months later when he was captured.

== Battle ==
Spies for William de Beauchamp, 9th Earl of Warwick brought news that Madog's army was camped in a valley some miles from Oswestry, where the earl then was. The earl led a night march on 4-5 March to encircle the Welsh. In response Madog formed his spearmen into a square (Schiltron) to repel the English cavalry charge. However, Warwick deployed his archers and crossbowmen, which gave the English the upper hand. Under a hail of arrows and bolts, rapidly followed by a cavalry charge, Madog's men were driven from the battlefield. Many drowned retreating across the swollen River Banwy near Llanfair Caereinion about 4 mi (6.4 km) to the west.

The contemporary Annals of Worcester states:

"On 5th March William de Beauchamp, Earl of Warwick, gave battle to the Welsh in the place which is called in their own language Meismeidoc. He struck down some 700 of the more noble among them, besides men who were drowned and fatally wounded. But Madoc ap Llwelyn, their prince, barely and disgracefully escaped."

A contemporaneous newsletter, copied into the Hagnaby Chronicle, recounts:

"The prince [Madog] came into Powys with the elite of his Welshmen, and our spies came by night to Oswestry and told us that the prince had gone as far as Cydewain. They [the earl of Warwick and his men] went as quickly as they could to Montgomery on the Friday and the Saturday, 5th March.The prince's host awaited our men on open ground and they fought together, our men killing a good 600. Then our men from Llystynwynnan joined battle with those who were transporting the prince's victuals, killing a good 100, and seized [about] 120 beasts laden with foodstuffs. And we lost only one esquire, Robert FitzWalter's tailor, and six foot soldiers, but a good ten horses were killed."

Writing about 1320, the exceptionally well-informed and well-connected chronicler Nicholas Trevet noted:

"The earl of Warwick heard that the Welsh had gathered in great numbers in a valley between two woods. Bringing with him a select force of knights, crossbowmen and archers, he surprised and surrounded them on all sides by night. In order to defend themselves against a cavalry charge, [the Welshmen] planted their spear butts in the ground with the tips pointing towards the enemy. But the earl placed a crossbowman [or archer] between every two horsemen. And, once a large number of spearmen had been struck down by crossbow bolts [or arrows], he charged the remainder with his cavalry. He inflicted such slaughter as is thought never before to have happened in times past."

The battle was a crucial step in breaking Welsh resistance in the revolt; Madog never recovered and was captured in late July 1295. He died in captivity in London sometime after 1305.

== Notes ==
=== Bibliography ===
- Morris, J. E. (1901). The Welsh Wars of Edward I. Oxford.
- Edwards, J. G. (1924). "The Battle of Maes Madog and the Welsh Campaign of 1294-5". The English Historical Review. 39 (153): 1–12.
