= Llywelyn Fychan ap Gruffudd =

Lord of Northern Powys in 1282

- Lord of Northern Powys
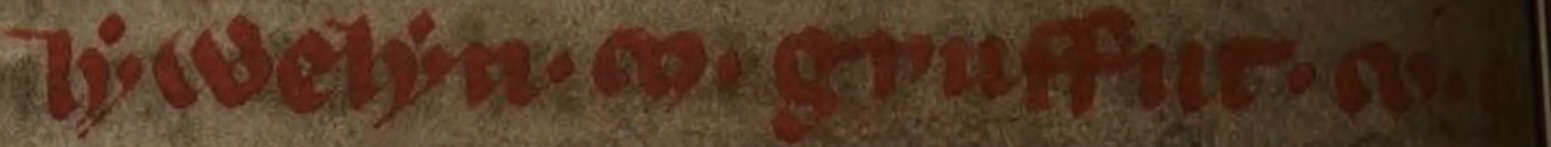
- Llywelyn's name in the rubrication of Llygad Gŵr's panegyric to him in the Hendregadredd Manuscript: lywelyn m. gruffut m. m[...]
- Predecessor: Gruffudd ap Madog
- Died: 11 December 1282; Cilmeri, Builth, Wales
- Noble family: Lleision
- Father: Gruffudd Maelor
- Mother: Emma Audley
- Military career
- Allegiance: England (1276-1277); Gwynedd (1282)
- Conflicts: Anglo-Welsh wars Conquest of Wales by Edward I Battle of Builth † (1282)

Llywelyn Fychan ap Gruffudd ap Madog (Note: Welsh pronunciation: [ɬəˈwɛlɪn ˈvəχan ap ˈɡrɨ̞fɨ̞ð ap ˈmadɔɡ]) (died 11 December 1282) was the last lord of Northern Powys. He was one of four sons of Gruffudd Maelor, the senior representative of the northern branch of the dynasty of the Lleision. In 1269, Gruffudd Maelor died, and his inheritance was divided under the supervision of their overlord Llywelyn ap Gruffudd, the ruler of Gwynedd and first recognised Prince of Wales. Llywelyn Fychan would receive lands in the south-east part of the lordship, namely Nanheudwy, part of Cynllaith, part of Mochnant and Carreghofa.

Llywelyn Fychan sided with Edward I of England in the war of 1277 against Llywelyn ap Gruffudd, perhaps because of his displeasure with the division of his father's lands. Edward rewarded Llywelyn Fychan with half of Northern Powys, but the other half was kept by his elder brother Madog, who retained the overlordship of the region except Dinas Brân, the symbolic centre of the area. Madog died shortly after, and left two young sons, who died mysteriously by 1282, leaving Llywelyn the sole ruler of Northern Powys. Llywelyn Fychan sided with Gwynedd against Edward I in the war of war of 1282, and was killed alongside Llywelyn ap Gruffudd in the Battle of Orewin Bridge near Builth on 11 December of that year.

== Early life and career ==
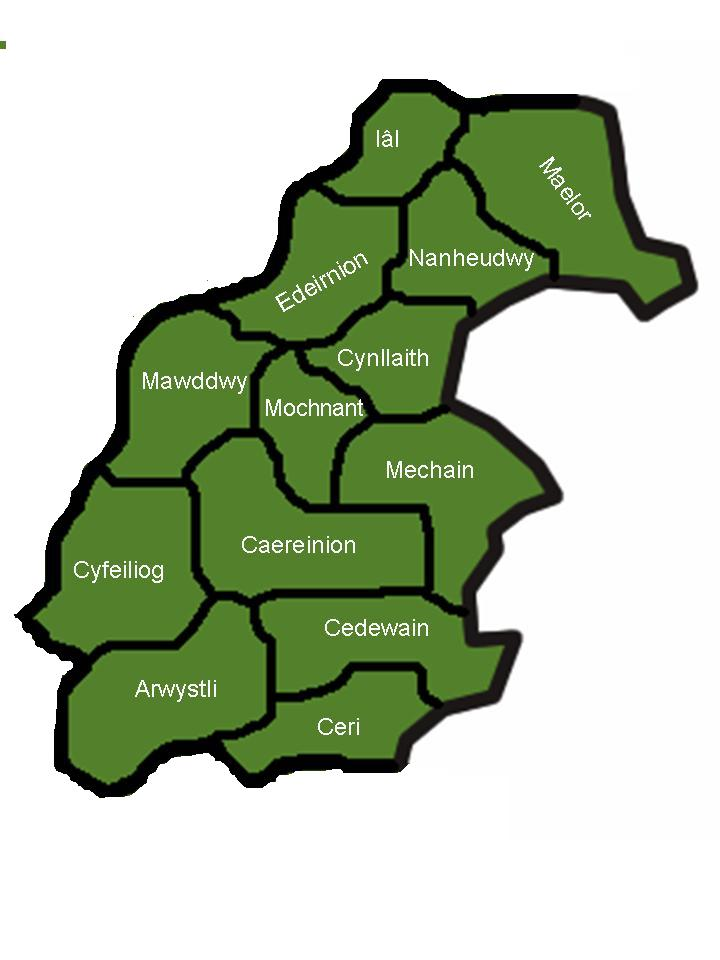
The cantrefi of medieval Powys. The lordship of Northern Powys consisted of the five northernmost cantrefi. Glyndyfrdwy is located in Edeirnion.

Llywelyn Fychan was a member of the Lleision, the lordly dynasty of Powys. He was the second son of Gruffudd Maelor, lord of Northern Powys, and Emma Audley, daughter of Henry Audley, an English nobleman from Staffordshire and retainer of the Earl of Chester. His existence is first recorded in 1269, after the death of his father. Following the Treaty of Montgomery in 1267, Llywelyn ap Gruffudd of Gwynedd was recognised as Prince of Wales and overlord of the native Welsh nobility, and so Llywelyn took the responsibility of dividing Gruffudd Maelor's estate between his four sons. Llywelyn gave to Madog lands in the north-eastern part of their father's patrimony, namely Maelor Gymraeg, Maelor Saesneg, and half of Glyndyfrdwy, while Llywelyn Fychan received lands in the south-east part of the lordship, specifically Nanheudwy, part of Cynllaith, part of Mochnant and Carreghofa. Gruffudd Fychan received part of Glyndyfrdwy and Yale in the western part of Northern Powys, while Owain received Bangor Is Coed and part of Cynllaith. Llywelyn ap Gruffudd appears to have favoured Madog, who was married to his sister Margaret, and seen him as his chief vassal in Northern Powys. Madog was the only one of his brothers to be present at the 1274 trial of Llywelyn's would-be murderers Gruffudd ap Gwenwynwyn, his son Owain, and Dafydd ap Gruffudd, which may suggest he was the favoured vassal and representative to Llywelyn in the area. Gruffudd and his sons fled Wales, and together with their kinsman John Lestrange launched raids on Northern Powys from Chester.

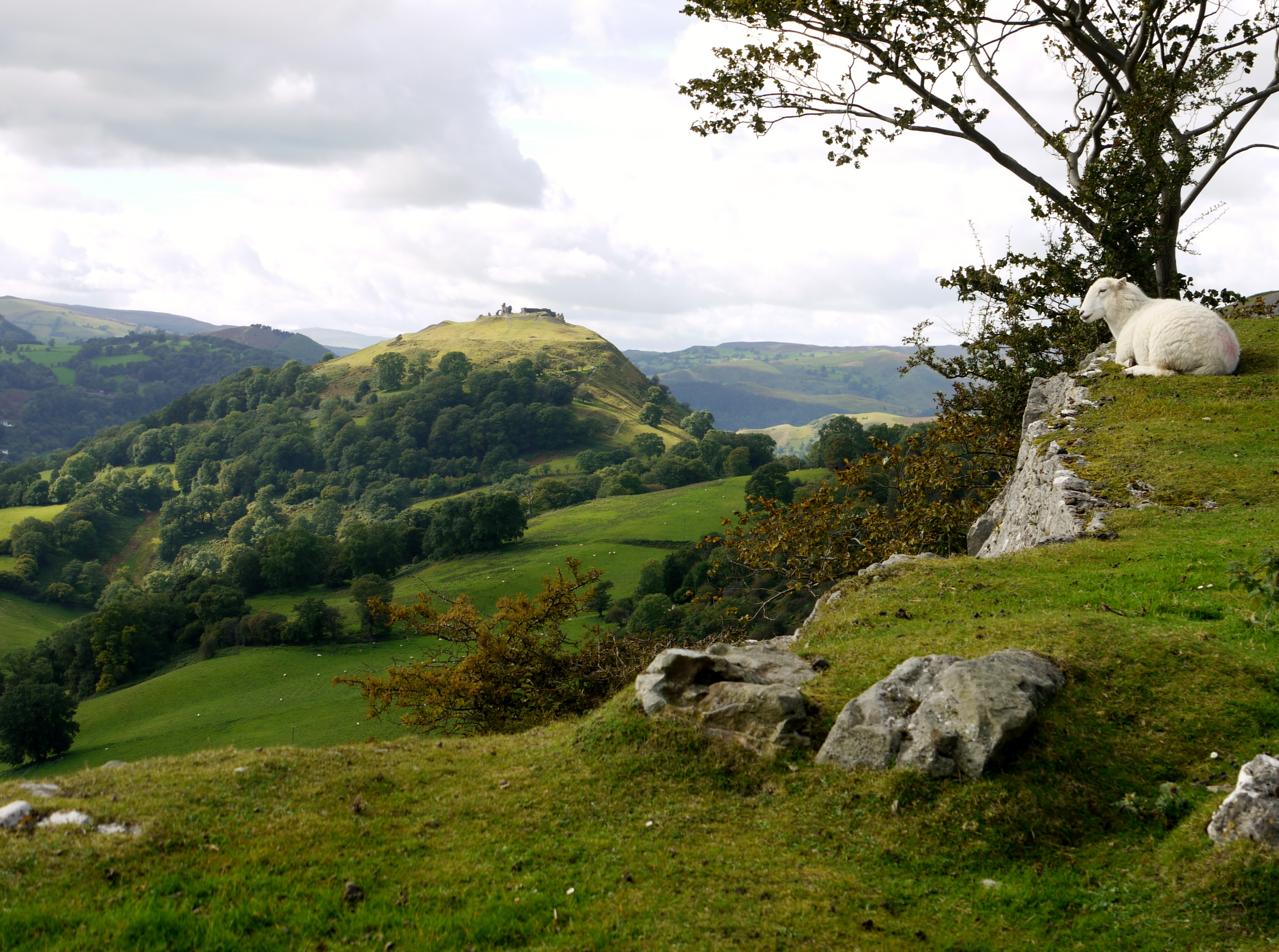
Castell Dinas Brân, Llywelyn ap Gruffudd's and later Edward I's stronghold in Northern Powys's heart

The intervention of Llywelyn ap Gruffudd in the affairs of Northern Powys may have caused resentment in Llywelyn Fychan, who in December 1276 was the first of his brothers to surrender to Edward I of England when the king declared war on Llywelyn ap Gruffudd the month prior. Madog would only join with Edward in April 1277, after Llywelyn ap Gruffudd had taken direct control of Northern Powys at the outbreak of the war. As part of this campaign, Llywelyn ap Gruffudd had seized the castle of Dinas Brân. This castle was built by Gruffudd Maelor as a symbol of the unity of Northern Powys, but was shared between Madog and Llywelyn Fychan before becoming a symbol of Venedotian dominance in the region following Llywelyn ap Gruffudd's garrisoning of the castle with his own troops. Part of Llywelyn Fychan's agreement with Edward was that his lands would subsequently be held of the king and therefore removed from the Principality of Wales, but this clause was made redundant by the terms of the November 1277 Treaty of Aberconwy following Llywelyn ap Gruffudd's defeat. Madog and Llywelyn Fychan had negotiated with the Earl of Warwick in April 1277 that Northern Powys would be split equally between them, but Edward retained Dinas Brân to be destroyed at his leisure and allowed Gruffudd Fychan to retain part of Edeirnion as a vassal of Llywelyn Fychan and Yale of Edward, while Owain, the rector of St Dunawd's Church in Bangor Is-Coed, was allowed to keep part of Cynllaith.

== Final years: 1277–1282 ==
Madog Fychan died only a month after the Treaty of Aberconwy, leaving two sons, Gruffudd and Llywelyn. With the end of the war came many claims on the part of other nobles claiming to be members of the Lleision who sought land in every part of Northern Powys. Llywelyn Fychan would later claim to Archbishop Peckham that he spent over £200 in combatting the demands of Gruffudd Fychan of Kinnerley, his distant cousin and a descendant of Iorwerth Goch. Llywelyn lost a case against Hywel and Dafydd, the sons of his cousin Einion ap Gruffudd Iâl, but the king's bailiff of Dinas Brân was unable to restore them to their lands because of Llywelyn's refusal to cooperate. In one of Llywelyn's letters of complaint to Edward from this period, Llywelyn complains that some of the Welsh who remained loyal to Llywelyn ap Gruffudd "rejoice[d] at [his] trouble and molestation". Edward assuaged Llywelyn by granting him the right to hold a weekly market and annual fair at his vill of Llanarmon Dyffryn Ceiriog in Cynllaith in 1279. This would have had the added benefit of making his lordship less dependent on the market in Oswestry. However, the men of Oswestry would prove a constant problem for Llywelyn, as he would later complain that they ravaged his lands in the area of Llansilin, hanged two of his leading men, and stole animals from his lordship; according to David Stephenson this would have been a sorer wound for Llywelyn because his ancestor had been lord of Oswestry. Llywelyn also complained of the actions of Roger Lestrange, the lord of Ellesmere. The animosity between the two was noticed by the poet Llygad Gŵr, who sang to Llywelyn in about 1280 and urged him to burn Fulk FitzWarin's castle of Whittington and destroy Ellesmere. At some point, Llywelyn was even captured by Lestrange and forced to ransom himself.

Faced with these difficulties, Llywelyn Fychan joined his near namesake Llywelyn ap Gruffudd in the war of 1282. Llywelyn immediately took the initiative and attacked Oswestry, together with a combined force of men from Nanheudwy, Cynllaith, Mochnant Is Rhaeadr and part of Mechain. Llywelyn Fychan had increased his territories as by midsummer 1282, his nephews, Madog's sons Gruffudd and Llywelyn, were dead, and the mysterious circumstances surrounding their death led to rumours that they had been murdered. Llywelyn Fychan would not long enjoy the fruits of his new territories, as he joined the ill-fated expedition of Llywelyn ap Gruffudd to Builth in winter of 1282, where he was slain on 11 December at the prince's side. A unified Northern Powys did not survive the war, and the only remaining representative of the dynasty was Gruffudd Fychan, who named his eldest son Madog likely in a continuation of a pretension to the lordship.

== Works cited ==
=== Primary sources ===
- Andrews, Rhian M.; Costigan (Bosco), N. G.; James, Christine; Lynch, Peredur I.; McKenna, Catherine; Owen, Morfydd E.; Roberts, Brynley F., eds. (1996). Gwaith Bleddyn Fardd a Beirdd Ereill Ail Hanner y Drydedd Ganrif ar Ddeg (in Welsh). Cardiff: University of Wales Press. ISBN 0708313469.
- Davies, J. Conway, ed. (1940). The Welsh Assize Roll, 1277-1284. Cardiff: University of Wales Press.
- Bartrum, P. C., ed. (1974). Welsh Genealogies: AD 300-1400. Cardiff: University of Wales Press. ISBN 070830561X. Archived from the original on 6 June 2023.
- Edwards, John Goronwy, ed. (1940). Littere Wallie preserved in Liber A in the Public Record Office. Cardiff: University of Wales Press. hdl:20.500.14106/0506.
- Lyte, H.C. Maxwell, ed. (1901). Calendar of the patent rolls preserved in the Public Record Office: Edward I. Vol. 1, A.D. 1272-1281. London: HM Stationery Office. IA calendarofpatent01grea.
  ——, ed. (1906). Calendar of the Charter Rolls preserved in the Public Record Office. London: HM Stationery Office. IA calendarofcharte02grea.
  ——, ed. (1912). Calendar of Various Chancery Rolls: Supplementary Close rolls, Welsh Rolls, Scutage Rolls: A. D. 1277 – 1326. London: HM Stationery Office. IA cu31924026113880.
- Martin, C. T., ed. (1884). Registrum epistolarum fratris Johannis Peckham, archiepiscopi Cantuariensis (in Latin). Vol. II. London: Longman & Co. IA bwb_T3-CBQ-991_2.
- Pryce, Huw, ed. (2005). The Acts of Welsh Rulers, 1120–1283. Cardiff: University of Wales Press. ISBN 9780708323830. IA actsofwelshruler0000unse.
- Rees, William, ed. (1975). Calendar of Ancient Petitions Relating to Wales. Cardiff: University of Wales Press. ISBN 9780708305669.

=== Secondary sources ===
- Smith, J. Beverley (1964–1966). "Offra Principis Wallie Domino Regi". Bulletin of the Board of Celtic Studies. 21. Cardiff: University of Wales Press: 362–367.
  —— (1986). "Dynastic Succession in Medieval Wales". Bulletin of the Board of Celtic Studies. 33. Cardiff: University of Wales Press: 199–232.
  —— (2001). Llywelyn ap Gruffudd, Prince of Wales. University of Wales Press. ISBN 9780708314746.
- Stephenson, David (2016). Medieval Powys: Kingdom, Principality and Lordships, 1132-1293. Studies in Celtic History. Woodbridge: Boydell Press. ISBN 9781783271405.

Titles of nobility
Preceded by Gruffudd ap Madog	Lord of Northern Powys; 1282	Succeeded by None
