= Caer Gai =

Roman fort in Gwynedd, Wales

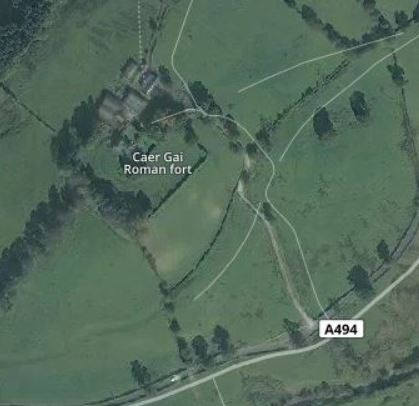
- Aerial view of Caer Gai

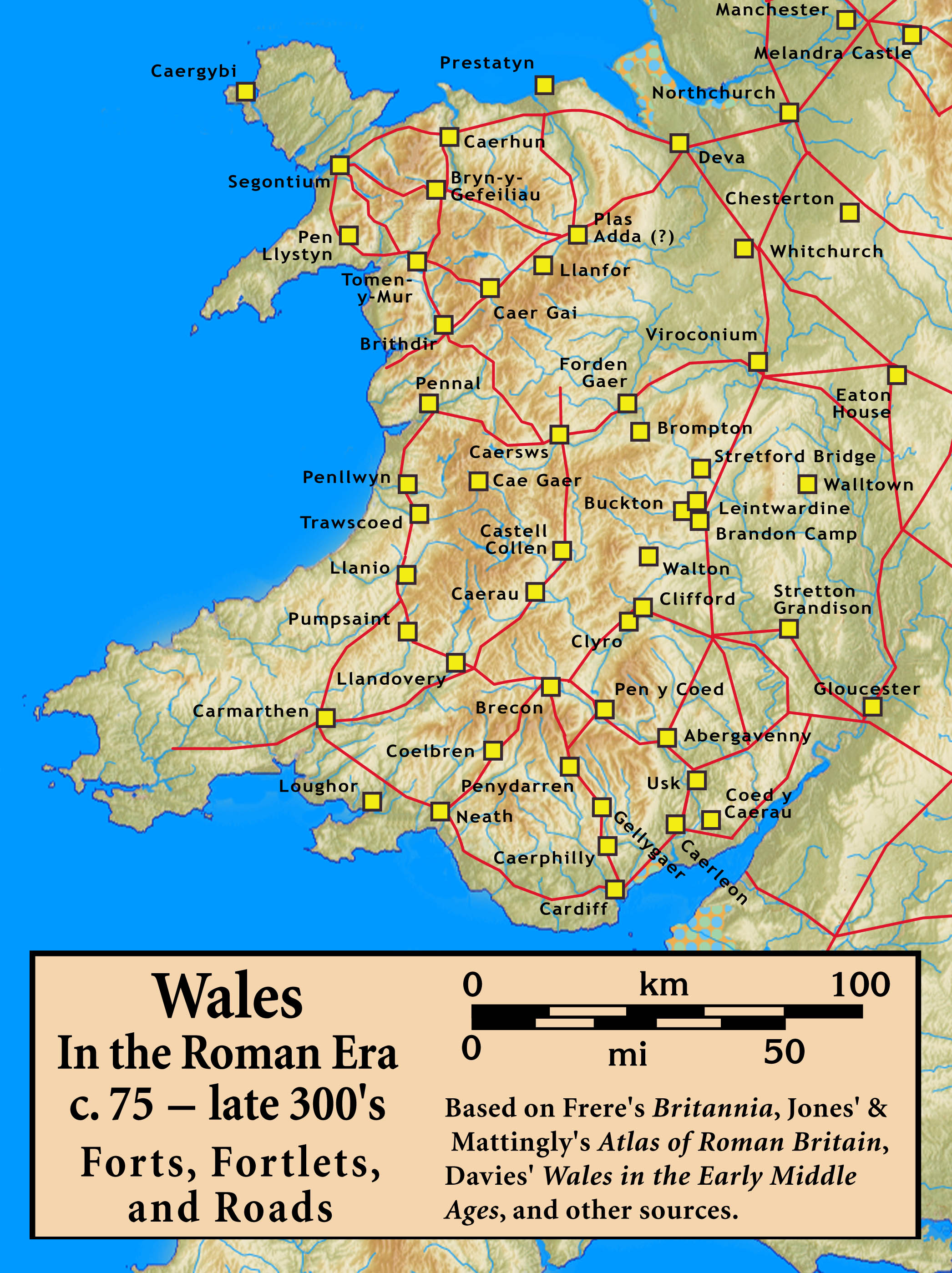
- 52°52′6.312″N 3°40′10.74″W
- Type: fort
- Periods: Classical antiquity
- Cultures: Roman Britain
- Associated with: Auxilia (Nervii)
- Location: Penllyn, Gwynedd
- Region: Wales

History
- Built: 1st - 2nd centuries CE
- Built by: Roman Army
- Abandoned: 5th century CE

Site notes
- Material: First fort: earth and wood Second fort: stone
- Elevation: 200 m (660 ft)
- Area: 4 acres (1.6 ha)
- Condition: earthworks
- Management: CADW

Designations
- Designation: ME018

Caer Gai (also Caer-gai) is a Grade II listed Roman fort in the district of Penllyn, Gwynedd, Wales, UK. It is located about 1 mile or 1.6 km north of the village of Llanuwchllyn, and the same distance west of Llyn Tegid (Lake Bala).

== Toponym ==
The fort's Roman name is unknown. During the medieval period, the site became associated with the legendary hero Cai, son of Cynyr (Sir Kay is a character in Arthurian literature). The fort is mentioned as Cai's home in the work of the Bards of the Nobility (Welsh: Beirdd yr Uchelwyr). Other Medieval Welsh stories that mention the fort include Culhwch and Olwen and Three Welsh Romances.

== History ==
=== Roman ===
The first fort, which is believed to have been constructed during the reign of Emperor Titus in the 1st Century CE, was built from wood and earth. It was sited next to the River Dee near a ford and junction of two Roman roads running through the area. One was a minor route of Sarn Helen that linked Deva Victrix (Chester) and a fort at Brithdir, Caerphilly. The other road connected the outpost with the Roman fort of Tomen y Mur, through Pennant-Lliw. The fort lay on a low shoulder with steep slopes on three sides. To the north, is Arenig Fawr (854 m (2,802 ft)) with the Berwyn Mountains and Aran Benllyn to the south.

A second fort built in stone replaced the earlier earthen wood fort in the 2nd century CE. It enclosed about 4 acres (1.6 ha). A fragment of a statue was discovered with a Latin inscription recording that it was built by Julius, son of Gavero, a soldier in the 1st Cohort of the Nervii: 'IVLIVS GAVERONIS F(ilius) FE(cit) MIL(es) CHO(cohortis) I(primae) NER(vium)'. The statue stood in a sanctuary 100 m (330 ft) to the east of the fort; shards of pottery were also found there dating from around the first half of the 2nd century (AD).

=== Medieval and Renaissance periods ===
The fort was the home of the bard Tudur Penllyn (c. 1420–1485) and his son Ieuan (fl. c. 1480). Tudur obtained the fort after marrying Gwerful Fychan, a descendant of Rhirid the Wolf (died c. 1160), and the fort may have been owned by Rhirid when he received the lordship of Penllyn. There are references to the court of Penllyn being held at the fort in medieval times, before it moved to Bala.

Rowland Vaughan (c. 1587–1667), a poet and well-known royalist in the English Civil War built a large house across part of the site. Although it burnt down in 1645 during the war, it was replaced by a farmhouse.

== Preservation ==
The site is managed by CADW and is open to the public. It is Grade II listed. The remains of the fort's wall can be seen in places showing up to five courses of stonework.

Archaeological excavations in the area have found a Roman tomb about 400 m (1,300 ft) to the north-east of the fort. Traces of a building, probably a bath house, have also been discovered to the south-east. A civilian small settlement is assumed to have surrounded the fort.

== Sources ==
- Rachel Bromwich, Triads of the Island of Britain (Cardiff, 1978)
- Thomas Roberts (ed.), The work of Gwaith Tudur Penllyn and Ieuan ap Tudur Penllyn (Cardiff, 1958)
- Grace Simpson, Caerleon and the Roman Forts in Wales in the second century AD, Archaeologia Cambrensis CXI (1962).
