= Fychan =

Fychan is a surname. Notable people with the surname include:

- Ednyfed Fychan (c. 1170 – 1246), full name Ednyfed Fychan ap Cynwrig, Welsh warrior who became seneschal to the Kingdom of Gwynedd in Northern Wales
- Gruffudd Fychan (disambiguation) (antiquarian spelling: Gruffydd Fychan) could refer to:
  - Gruffudd Fychan I, Prince of Powys Fadog (reigned 1277-84)
  - Gruffudd Fychan II (c. 1330-1369), Lord of Glyndyfrdwy and Cynllaith and father of Owain Glyndŵr, Prince of Wales
  - Gruffudd Fychan ap Gruffudd ab Ednyfed (14th century), a Welsh-language poet
- Gruffydd ap Madog Fychan, according to some sources the son of Madog Fychan the hereditary Prince of Powys Fadog between 1304-c.1325.
- Gwerful Fychan (fl.1420–1490), poet during the period of the Welsh Beirdd yr Uchelwyr during the late Middle Ages
- Llywelyn ap Gruffydd Fychan of Caeo (c. 1341–1401), wealthy Carmarthenshire landowner who was executed in Llandovery by Henry IV of England in punishment for his support of Owain Glyndŵr's Welsh rebellion
- Madog Fychan, may have had a claim to be a hereditary Prince of Powys Fadog 1304-ca. 1325. However his very existence is uncertain. It is claimed that he succeeded to his father Madog Crypl's titles on his death in 1304. However, it is more likely that Madog Crypl's son was Gruffydd, who was succeeded by Gruffydd Fychan II, the father of Owain Glyndŵr
- Myfanwy Fychan (born mid-14th century), Welsh noblewoman, who was involved in a famous romance with a bard
- Owain Fychan ap Madog (alternatively Owain Vychan ap Madoc) (c.1125-1187), Styled Lord of Mechain Is Coed[1] and one of the sons of Madog ap Maredudd.
- Simwnt Fychan (c. 1530 – 1606) was a Welsh language poet and genealogist
