= Battle of Orewin Bridge =

1282 battle between the English and Welsh

- Part of Edwardian Conquest of Wales
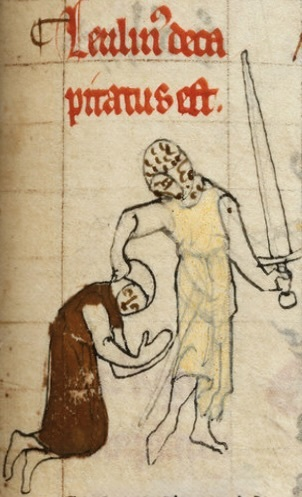
- The decapitation of Llywelyn ap Gruffudd, as depicted in the Rochester Chronicle
| Date | 11 December 1282 |
| Location | Cilmeri, Builth, Wales 52.1519°N 3.4617°W |
| Result | English victory |

Belligerents
| Kingdom of England | Kingdom of Gwynedd |

Commanders and leaders
| Roger Lestrange; John Giffard; Edmund Mortimer | Llywelyn ap Gruffudd †; Llywelyn Fychan ap Gruffudd †; Dafydd ab Einion Fychan † |

The Battle of Orewin Bridge (also known as the Battle of Irfon Bridge or the Battle of Builth) was a confrontation between an English force guided by Roger Lestrange and a Welsh force led by Prince Llywelyn ap Gruffudd. It was fought on 11 December 1282 near Builth Wells in mid-Wales. It was a decisive defeat for the Welsh and Llywelyn ap Gruffudd was killed, leading to the final defeat of the Welsh rebels by the armies of Edward I of England some months later.

The exact details of the confrontation, including the geographic setting and its scale, are heavily contested, both among contemporary chronicles and later scholars.

== Background ==
On 10 December 1277, the Treaty of Aberconwy was signed between Wales and England following an English invasion in the same year. It forced Llywelyn to pay an indemnity of 50,000 marks, allow Edward I to build castles at key points, and marry the English noblewoman Eleanor de Montfort. The treaty was deeply unpopular in Wales, leading to a general revolt throughout much of Wales five years later. Both Llywelyn and Edward I mobilized their armies to march on the other's territory while also opening negotiations. Edward suffered a setback at the Battle of Menai in November but remained intent on conquering Wales. Meanwhile, Llywelyn led a campaign throughout the southern districts of Wales. When English commander Roger Lestrange received news of Llywelyn's movements in Wales, he assembled an army to intercept him in the southern districts. His force numbered at least 2,000 infantry and 20 cavalry, but the true extent of his force is unknown.

On 11 December, Llywelyn moved south out of Gwerthrynion and into Builth. David Stephenson notes the role of the brothers Edmund, 2nd Baron Mortimer of Wigmore and Roger, 1st Baron Mortimer of Chirk in this action. They likely lured Llywelyn in on false promises of homage, though there is no definite proof of this. Their father, Roger, 1st Baron Mortimer of Wigmore, had recently died and his command has been handed over to Roger Lestrange. It is unlikely that Lestrange, in overall command, was present at Orewin Bridge.

Emma Cavell argues that noble wives likely played an important behind-the-scenes role in the lead-up to the confrontation. Women such as Maud Mortimer or Hawise Lestrange were part of the network of spies relied by upon men in tracking the movements of Llywelyn. Their authority as women came from key social networks they held as aristocratic ladies.

== Battle ==
Modern-day borders of Wales. Orewin Bridge was close to Cilmeri.

The details surrounding Llywelyn's death have been examined by a number of historians over the decades. For example, John Edward Morris, John Edward Lloyd, and David Stephenson primarily relied on the chronicle of Walter of Guisborough, also known as Walter of Hemingburgh.

According to Walter, Llywelyn left his main army up in mountains near a river called Wyne. Next, he assembled a small contingent to march down and guard the bridge of Orewin. The English army, led by John Giffard and Roger Mortimer the younger, assembled on the other side of the river, undecided on a course of action. At this moment, a local Welshman told the army of a ford upstream that would allow the English army to cross. This advice was accepted and the English began to cross. Llywelyn then went to investigate noise he heard from that direction when he was suddenly struck down by Stephen de Frankton, an English soldier. The English then marched on the unsuspecting Welsh army in the mountains and cut them down. Following this, Stephen realized whom he had struck and went back to finish the killing blow. Stephenson places the Welsh dead at 160 horsemen and 3,000 infantry out of their initial force of 7,000, though the reliability of this number is questioned by Llinos Beverley Smith.

This account received careful examination by Llinos Beverley Smith in 1982. She criticized it on two grounds. The first is that no other Welsh or English sources from the time match Walter's telling of events (though some Welsh sources do speak of Llywelyn being separated from his army and his downfall at the hand of the two lords). The second is the account with similarities to his account on the Battle of Stirling Bridge, which took place between England and Scotland in 1297. Both battles involved the existence of a ford upstream from the site of battle where the English army could cross safely. Both English armies share the same predicament, a narrow bridge crossing in front of them that would allow opposing forces to easily counter the armies. Lastly, a group of Scots near Stirling surrendered to the English at Irewyn (Irvine), a name very similar to Orewyn (Irfon). Based on this, Llinos Beverley Smith concludes that Walter's telling of events deserves at least "considerable skepticism".

Michael Prestwich agrees that the similarities of the accounts "cast some doubt" on Walter's, and Wayne Bartlett says there are "grounds to be suspicious". Nonetheless, J. Beverley Smith argues that some details can be shown to be true, such as location on the banks of the Orewin (Irfon), which is corroborated by Welsh chronicles.

An alternative telling of events is provided by the Hagnaby Chronicle. It agrees with Walter insofar as Llywelyn came to Bulith at the insistence of Mortimer to receive his homage. It then states that this was a ruse by Mortimer to lure the Prince and ambush him. Llywelyn, shortly after coming to the agreed-upon meeting place, was attacked by English forces. Following a lengthy battle between the Welsh and English armies in which both sides suffered heavy losses, the Welsh army broke and left Llywelyn alone on the battlefield with a single servant. The two tried fleeing to the woods, but were pursued by English forces. After lengthy combat Llywelyn fell, calling out his true identity to the opposing army, but was executed anyways. This account differs from the first in that it lacks a river, bridge, or ford. Meanwhile, Llywelyn participated in the main battle rather than being ambushed as in Walter of Guisborough's chronicle. Both Walter and the Hagnaby Chronicle agree on Roger Mortimer's presence at the battle. His brother Edmund is more likely, as in the Annals of Oseney and the Annals of Dunstable.

Also of question is the soldier who killed Llywelyn. Morris relates this Stephen to a company commander of Shropshire infantry from Ellesmere, an area close to the battle. However, another possible soldier is Robert Body. According to this line, Robert found Llywelyn in nearby woods and proceeded to decapitate the Prince. Like Stephen, Robert also lived in Shropshire and was awarded lands in Ellesmere following a revolt by Ellesmere's ruler. J. Beverley Smith concludes that either soldier could have killed Llywelyn based on the available evidence.

Multiple other interpretations of what happened exist. Some chronicles tell of a small Welsh force being ambushed by a much larger English army after Llywelyn was falsely led to believe Mortimer would do homage to him. The Welsh chronicle Brut y Tywysogyon does not tell of a large pitched battle, instead reporting that Llywelyn came to the site with only a few men, whereupon he was ambushed by the English army. However, other chronicles tell of a large pitched battle in line with that Walter and the Hagnaby Chronicle write. In summarizing the various accounts of Llywelyn's death, J. Beverley Smith concludes:

We cannot decide between them, and we can only conclude that, probably somewhere near Llanganten, above the Irfon in Buellt, on the feast of St Damasus in the heart of winter Llywelyn ap Gruffudd died by the hand of a soldier serving the king of England.

Chronicles relating to the battle only rarely mention women when recounting the Prince's wars and death. Cavell argues that chroniclers at the time emphasized accounts of "great male militarism" along with front-line activities.

== Aftermath ==
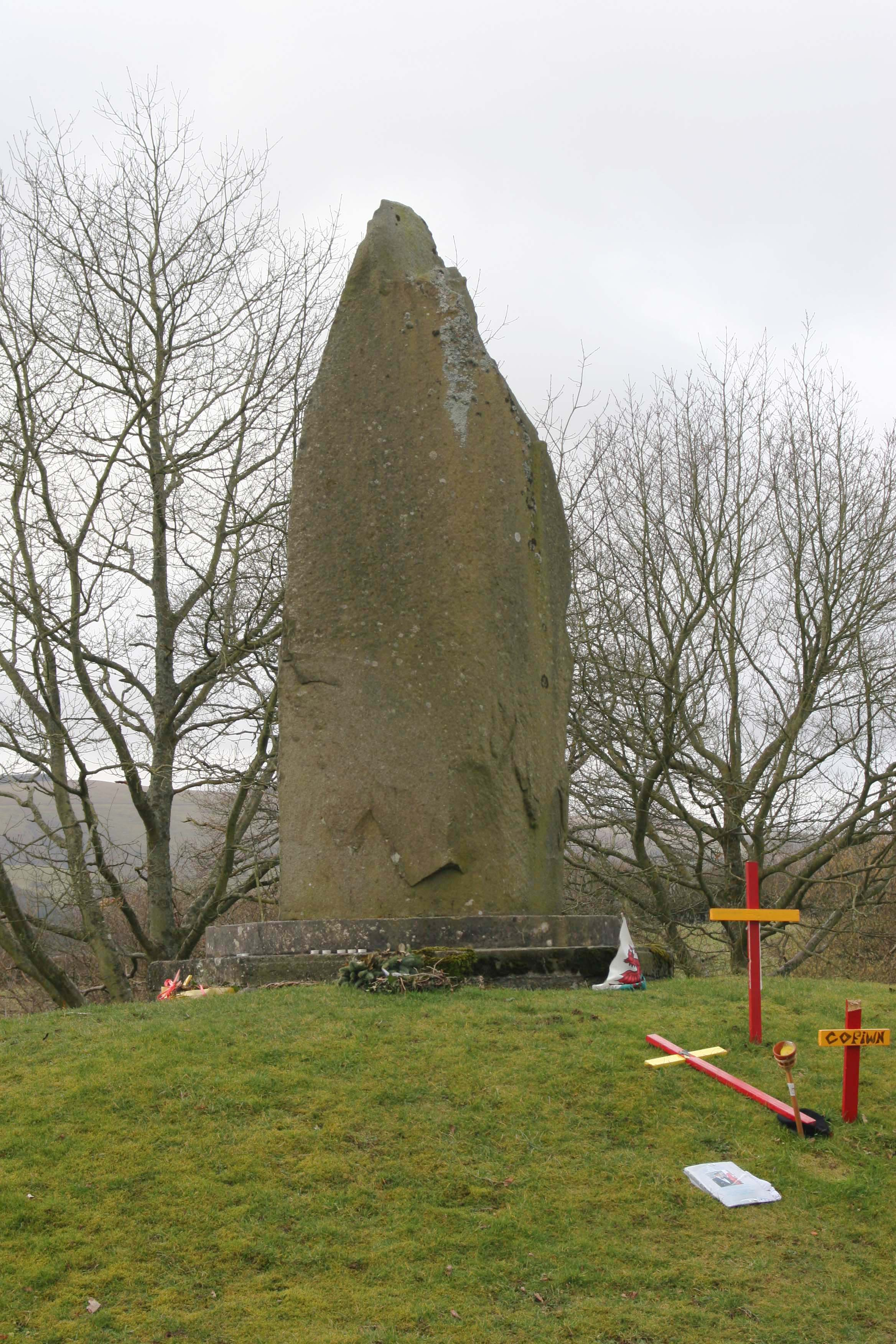
The memorial to Llywelyn ap Gruffudd in Cilmeri near the site of the battle, erected in 1956

Lestrange issued a dispatch to Edward I shortly after the victory announcing the death of Llywelyn and the "flower of his men". Following the death of Llywelyn, the Prince's severed head was firstly taken to Rhuddlan Castle and then brought to England and displayed at the Tower of London. According to Stephenson, the head was crowned as an act of ridicule to mock an old Welsh prophecy which stated that the Prince would be crowned in London following victory over his English foes. Then his body was taken by monks to be buried at the Cistercian Abbey at Cwmhir Abbey. Meanwhile, the news of the Prince's death was spread by English agents throughout Europe, such as from Orvieto in early 1283.

The death of Llywelyn did not lead to the immediate collapse of the Welsh armies. They would achieve some success in Ceredigion at the end of the year, while Llywelyn's brother, Dafydd ap Gruffudd, was crowned Prince of Wales to continue the fight against England. However, Dafydd did not command the same level of respect among his Welsh troops that Llywelyn had. Meanwhile English forces continued to gain in strength. By January, Edward I had five thousand men under his command. In May of 1283, Dafydd went into hiding. This was to avoid capture by English forces, along with some Welsh who threw their lot in with the English. Dafydd was captured in June, likely on the 22nd, and Edward I announced this on the 28th. With Welsh military resistance now broken, Edward I could focus his efforts on fortifying the conquered territory with English castles, effecting the annexation of Wales to England.

== Sources ==
- Bartlett, Wayne B. (2003). The Taming of the Dragon: Edward I and the Conquest of Wales. Sutton. ISBN 0-7509-3217-1.
- Cavell, Emma (2014). "Intelligence and Intrigue in the March of Wales: Noblewomen and the Fall of Llywelyn ap Gruffudd, 1274–8". Historical Research. 88 (239): 1–19. doi:10.1111/1468-2281.12068.
- Morris, John Edward, ed. (1899). "Two Documents Relating to the Conquest of Wales". The English Historical Review. 14 (55): 506–507. JSTOR 548776.
- Morris, John Edward (1996) [1901]. The Welsh Wars of Edward I: A Contribution to Mediaeval Military History, Based on Original Documents. Conshohocken: Combined Books.
- Prestwich, Michael (2012). "Document: Edward I's Wars in the Chronicle of Hagnaby Priory". Journal of Medieval Military History. 10: 197–214.
- Smith, Jenkyn Beverley (2014). Llywelyn ap Gruffudd: Prince of Wales. Cardiff: University of Wales Press.
- Smith, Llinos Beverley (1982). "The Death of Llywelyn ap Gruffydd: The Narratives Reconsidered". The Welsh History Review. Cardiff: 200–213.
- Stephenson, David (1983). The Last Prince of Wales. Llywelyn and King Edward: The End of the Welsh Dream, 1282–3. Buckingham: Barracuda Books Limited.
- Warner, Philip (1997) [1977]. Famous Welsh Battles: Where Battles Were Fought, Why They Were Fought, How They Were Won and Lost. New York: Barnes & Noble.
- Turvey, Roger (2010). Twenty-One Welsh Princes. Conwy: Gwasg Carreg Gwalch. ISBN 9781845272692.
