= Roger Mortimer, 1st Baron Mortimer of Chirk =

English lord (c. 1256–1326)

Roger Mortimer
- Baron Mortimer of Chirk
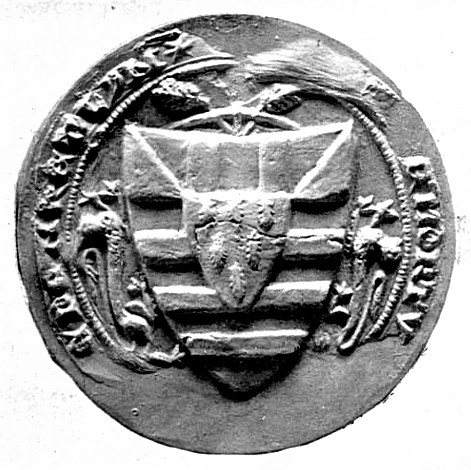
- Born: c.1256
- Died: 3 August 1326; Tower of London, London
- Buried: Wigmore Abbey
- Noble family: Mortimer
- Spouse: Lucy de la Wafre
- Issue: Roger Mortimer
- Father: Roger Mortimer, 1st Baron Mortimer
- Mother: Maud de Braose

Roger Mortimer, 1st Baron Mortimer of Chirk (c.1256 – 3 August 1326) was a 14th-century Marcher lord, notable for his opposition to Edward II of England during the Despenser War.

== Background and early service ==
Arms of Roger de Mortimer, Baron Mortimer of Chirk: Barry of six or and azure on a chief of the first two pallets between two gyrons of the second over all an inescutcheon ermine.

Roger was the third son of Roger Mortimer, a powerful Marcher lord in the Welsh border territories, and Maud de Braose, Baroness Mortimer who was also an important Marcher landowner in her own right. The family were from the second rank of parvenu nobility elevated by the king as a reward for fierce loyalty to the Plantagenet dynasty. But he was said to be a lecherous and violent man.

He married Lucy de la Wavre, the daughter of Sir Robert la Wavre, Lord of Hampton Wafer, Herefordshire, by whom he had one legitimate son, also named Roger. Presumably they were married by 8 June 1286, when Roger de Mortimer was presented at the manor of Tedstone Wafer.

In 1269, Gruffydd II, prince of Powys Fadog, died, and his lands were divided between his four sons. In 1277, the eldest son, Madog II, died; his two young brothers, Llywelyn and Owain, were still children, leaving them, and their lands, at the mercy of his eldest brother Gruffydd Fychan I. Mortimer was appointed by King Edward Longshanks to be the guardian of Owain and Llywelyn, but four years later their bodies washed up in the River Dee; Mortimer was accused of their murder. Mortimer, guilty or not, was granted their lands - the Cantref of Swydd y Waun. It is possible that Mortimer had needed the lands to raise his nephew, Roger, as his guardian.

In 1282, the ruling princes of Gwynedd attacked lands in the Perfeddwlad granted to King Edward under the Treaty of Aberconwy. Consequently, the Welsh wars broke out, and Mortimer, a professional soldier, was a captain in the victorious royal army. He and his brother, Edmund Mortimer, 2nd Baron Mortimer of Wigmore, have been implicated in the plot that lured Llywelyn ap Gruffudd, the last native Welsh prince of Wales, out of Gwynedd to his death with promises of allegiance.

At some point, probably after 1295, he began work on Chirk Castle, possibly designed by James of St George, the architect of Beaumaris Castle, but the castle remained unfinished at the time of his death.

Mortimer fought at the Battle of Falkirk (1298), when William Wallace was finally defeated. On 6 February, he was created Lord of Chirk. The Mortimers supported the King's policy in Scotland and on the Marches. Chirk pledged allegiance to Edward II, and was with the young King when he went to negotiate his marriage with Isabella of France. They arrived at Dover on 19 January 1308, and Mortimer left Edward to cross the channel.

The Mortimers acquired huge estates, taking ruthless control of Welsh strongholds. Roger was also granted the constableships of Blaenyllfori and Dinas in north Wales. Such was his power he was effectively a surrogate prince of Wales. Anticipating the nobles' conflict with Edward's favourite, Piers Gaveston, Chirk avoided confrontation when Gaveston was appointed Regent of England in the king's absence abroad.

== Feud with Griffith de la Pole ==
Mortimer prepared to attack Griffith de la Pole (anglicized from the Welsh, Gruffydd). The Welshman was from the line of Gruffydd ap Gwenwynwyn, ruler of Powys throughout the thirteenth century. His heir had died as a Royal Ward, leaving only a daughter, Hawise, who was married to Thomas de Charlton. Griffith was her uncle, and under ancient Salic laws the inheritance was said to be shared amongst men only. Griffith attacked John de Charlton in Welshpool Castle aiming to recover his property; whilst the king ignored pleas for a legal settlement. Griffith sought the help of Thomas of Lancaster, recently married to the Lincoln heiress Alice de Lacy.

Chirk was ordered by the king to break the siege, but de la Pole refused royal arbitration. John de Cromwell, the Royal Steward, was sent to pacify Griffith, but he refused any help. Abandoned by Lancaster, Griffith found another supporter in the Earl of Arundel, a marcher lord. This act was treason. At last Chirk broke the castle's resistance and took Griffith prisoner. Lancaster seeing his allies wilting, had a furious row with Chirk at the subsequent Commission of Inquiry in Westminster. Lancaster swore the Mortimers everlasting enmity; the debacle causing the ultimate destruction of both Chirk and Lancaster. Gaveston's death only months later left the Mortimers defending their estates from the Lancastrians.

== Chirk's role at Bannockburn ==
In March 1314 the King ordered Chirk to find 3,000 Welshmen for a Scottish campaign. They left the Marches on 27 May and went north. The army mustered at Wark Castle and then Berwick, to converge on Stirling Castle. The larger force had set out from Berwick on 17 June, and reached Edinburgh three days later. That Saturday they left Edinburgh, marching into the highlands towards Stirling. The next day, Sunday 23 June, the lead knights spotted Stirling. One account says they were ambushed in New Park. During the fateful battle on Monday 24 June, Chirk was probably with King Edward's household guard. They rallied around the King amongst 500 knights when all seemed lost. Chirk may have been in the rearguard action led by the Earl of Pembroke, as King Edward fled into the castle. Chirk had been associated with the Royal Bodyguard since the siege of Caerlaverock in 1300. The heroic knights at Bannockburn, Sir Paine Tibetot and Sir Giles d'Argentein, were part of the same group. Ian Mortimer suggests that Lord Chirk acted as an adviser to the Welsh archers.

== York Parliament 1314 ==
Mortimer, Chirk and their friends were in the ascendant at court, confirmed by Parliament at York in November 1314. Their association with Pembroke and Arundel identified the marcher lords with a 'middle party'. This was an attempt to make a genuine baronial party as an alternative to the Despensers hold over government. John de Charlton was made Chamberlain, and Archbishop of York William Melton became Keeper of the Wardrobe. However the Mortimers made a powerful enemy in the Younger Despenser who vowed to avenge Mortimer's grandfather killing his grandfather at the Battle of Evesham, 1265.

== Revolt of Llewelyn Bren ==
On 28 January 1316, the Sheriff of Glamorgan and his men holding court outside the walls of Caerphilly Castle were attacked by a gang of Welshmen led by Llewelyn Bren. He had declared war on the maladministration of Payn de Turberville, a new royal appointee. Years of famine and punitive taxation led Llewelyn to desperate measures in defence of his people. The Earl of Hereford and the Mortimers were ordered to raise men to crush the rebellion. A royal army of 2,150 marched north from Bristol to relieve Caerphilly, and Llewelyn surrendered at the head of the valleys. Just prior to this event Chirk attended his nephew Edmund's wedding at Ernwood, near Kinlet, to Elizabeth Badlesmere, daughter of Lord Badlesmere. It is possible that Chirk was present at the siege of Bristol on 26 July 1316.

== Justiciar of Wales ==
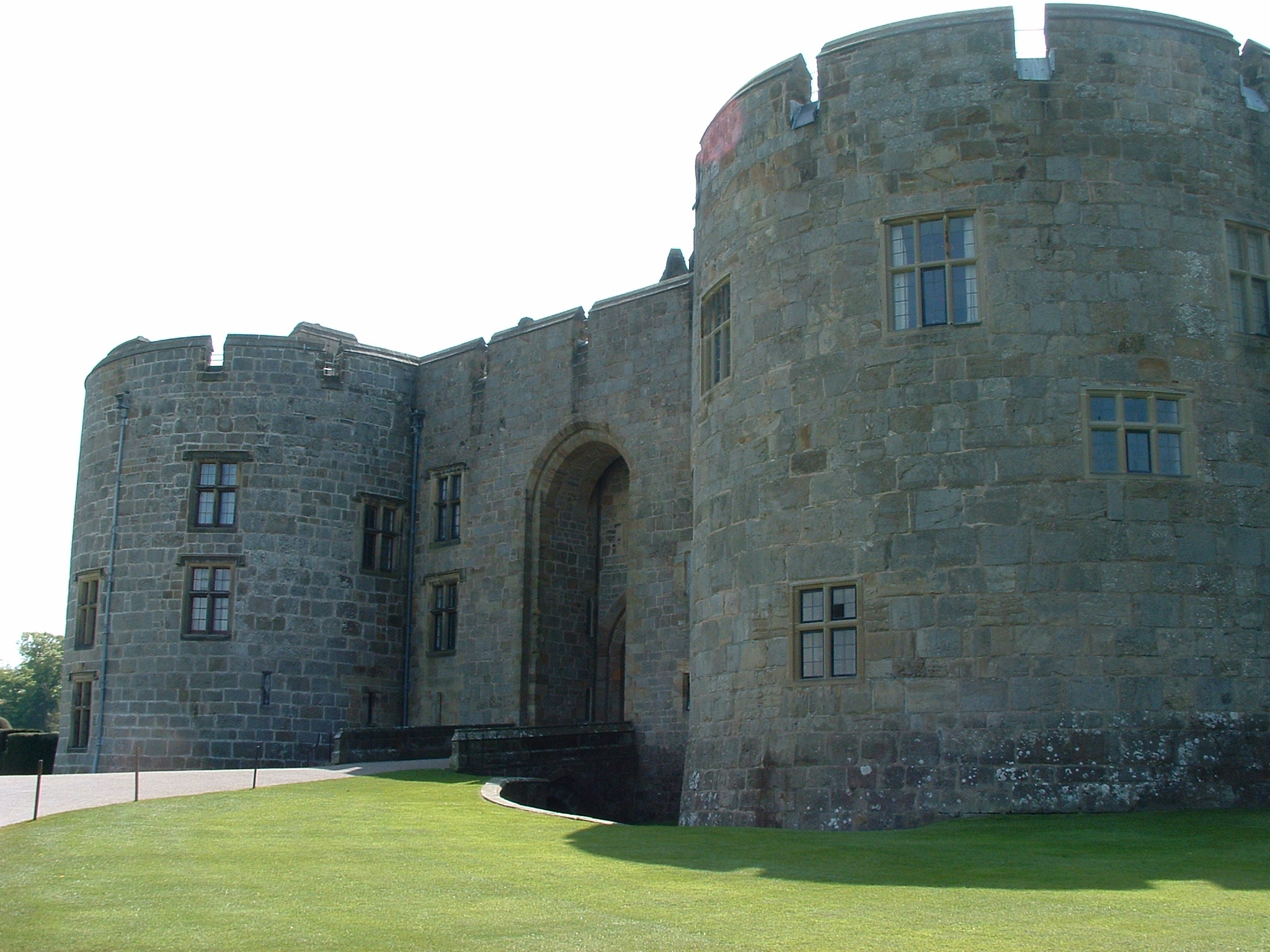
Chirk Castle

The disturbances in Wales caused the Lancastrians to have Chirk removed from office in January 1315. But when the Principality returned to peace, Chirk was re-appointed to post of Justiciar of North Wales in October 1316.

By the 1320s, Chirk was the leading member of the family and in fierce competition with the Despensers, a rival Marcher family headed by Hugh Despenser the Elder and his son Hugh Despenser the Younger, the royal favourite and rumored lover of Edward II. They seized the lordship of Gower and many others in a brazen land grabbing war.

== The Despenser war ==
With the Despensers in exile, Queen Isabella was eager to assist the King. She led an army with Earl of Arundel to besiege Baron Badlesmere, a crony of Lancaster's in Leeds Castle, Kent.

On 8 December 1321, the King arrived in Cirencester. Moving up the Severn valley from Gloucester, he was joined by the recalled Despensers. They crossed the river at Shrewsbury. Seeing the situation was hopeless, the Mortimers surrendered in January 1322. Others like Roger Damory fled north to join Lancaster. Chirk and his nephew were sent to the Tower; their henchmen to Wallingford Castle. Ian Mortimer disagrees with Paul Doherty's thesis that Chirk was mortally wounded, suggesting that Chirk lived on another three years.

== Death ==
Outnumbered, Roger Mortimer of Chirk and his nephew, Roger Mortimer, 3rd Baron Mortimer of Wigmore, later the lover and ally of Isabella of France, negotiated a surrender, thereby avoiding instant execution. They were sent to the Tower of London where they were kept in poor conditions. Lord Chirk died in the Tower, apparently of injuries sustained during the war, on 3 August 1326. He was buried in St Augustine's Priory, Bristol.

His nephew, Roger Mortimer, managed to escape the Tower and fled to France, from where he ultimately joined Isabella in successful rebellion against Edward II in 1326. Roger Mortimer of Wigmore eventually completed Chirk Castle before his death in 1330.

== In fiction ==
Roger Mortimer of Chirk is a supporting character in La Louve de France (The She-Wolf of France), a novel in Maurice Druon's series of French historical novels Les Rois maudits (The Accursed Kings). He was portrayed by Samson Fainsilber in the 1972 French miniseries adaptation of the series.

== Bibliography ==
- Doherty, Paul, Isabella and the Strange Death of Edward II. London: Robinson, 2003.
- Morris, J.E., The Welsh Wars of Edward I Oxford, 1901.
- Pettifer, Adrian, Welsh Castles: a Guide by Counties. Woodbridge: Boydell Press, 2000.
- Pratt, Derek, "The Marcher lordship of Chirk, 1329-1330", Trans of Denbighshire Hist Soc., XXXIX, 1990
- Prestwich, W, The Three Edwards: War and State in England, 1265-1377, London, 2003.
- Prestwich, M, Plantagenet England, 1215-1377, London, 2005.
- Smith, J. B., Llywelyn Ap Gruffudd: Prince of Wales. United Kingdom: University of Wales Press, 1998.
- Weir, A, Isabella, she-wolf of France, Queen of England, London: Jonathan Cape, 2005.
