= Rhos-y-gwaliau =

Coordinates: 52.9001°N 3.5732°W

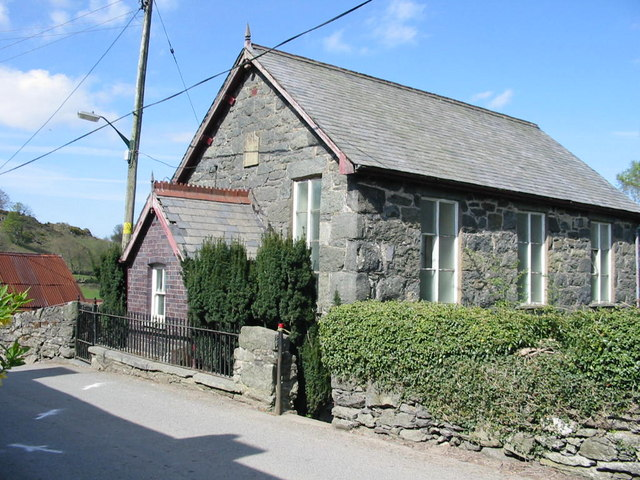
- Village chapel

- Location within Gwynedd
- Population: 86 (2011)
- OS grid reference: SH9434
  - Cardiff: 140 miles
- Community: Llandderfel
- Principal area: Gwynedd
- Country: Wales
- Sovereign state: United Kingdom
- Post town: BALA
- Postcode district: LL23
- Dialling code: 01678
- Police: North Wales
- Fire: North Wales
- Ambulance: Welsh
- UK Parliament: Dwyfor Meirionnydd
- Senedd Cymru – Welsh Parliament: Dwyfor Meirionnydd

Rhos-y-gwaliau is a small hamlet in Meirionnydd, Gwynedd, North Wales, about 1.5 miles (2.4 km) south-east of Bala. It is home to the Rhos y Gwaliau Outdoor Activity Centre and a now disused Victorian chapel, built for the Calvinistic Methodists.

The Berwyn Mountains rise behind the village. The village lies towards the lower end of the narrow Hirnant valley formed by the Hirnant stream, which rises at the crest of the Berwyns and flows into the River Dee. The valley gives its name to the Hirnantian Age in the Ordovician Period of geological time.

Close to the village is Plas Rhiwaedog, the manor house of the ancient Rhiwaedog estate.

Regional Cycle Route 12 passes through the village.
