= Owain ap Gruffydd =

Owain ap Gruffydd may refer to:

- Owain Gwynedd (c. 1100–1170), Prince of Gwynedd
- Owain Cyfeiliog (c. 1130–1197), Prince of part of Powys
- Owain Goch ap Gruffydd (died c. 1282), ruler of part of Gwynedd in the late 1240s and early 1250s, brother of Llywelyn the Last of Gwynedd
- Owen de la Pole, also known as Owain ap Gruffydd ap Gwenwynwyn (c. 1257–c. 1293), lord of Powys
- Owain Glyndŵr (1354–1416), Prince of Wales
