= Llywelyn ap Gruffudd (disambiguation) =

Llywelyn ap Gruffudd may refer to:

- Llywelyn ap Gruffudd (died 1282) or Llywelyn the Last, Prince of Wales
- Llywelyn Fychan ap Gruffudd (died 1282), last lord of Northern Powys
- Llywelyn Bren (died 1318) or Llywelyn ap Gruffudd ap Rhys, Glamorgan landowner and rebel
- Llywelyn ap Gruffudd Fychan (c. 1341 – 1401), Carmarthenshire landowner and rebel
