= Ieuan ap Tudur Penllyn =

Ieuan ap Tudur Penllyn (fl. 1480) was a Welsh poet of the late mediaeval period.

Ieuan was born at Caer-Gai, near Llanuwchllyn, Merioneth (present-day Gwynedd) and was the son of two notable poets: Tudur Penllyn and Gwerful Fychan. Through the latter he claimed descent from Rhirid Flaidd, a 12th-century nobleman of Powys.

In common with other poets of the time much of his work is "praise-poetry" directed at the Uchelwyr, or Welsh nobility, including members of the Abertanad family and the Wynns of Gwydir. Ieuan was of a gentry family himself so is unlikely to have been a 'professional' writer. His satire on the borough of Flint also survives along with several humorous disputations with the famous poet Guto'r Glyn.

His work has occasionally been confused in manuscripts with that of his father, and he seems to have had a sister, Gwenllian, who may also have been a poet.

His surviving poetry was edited by Thomas Roberts in 1958, in a single volume with the work of Tudur Penllyn.
