= Lordship of Bromfield and Yale =

Former Welsh marcher lordship

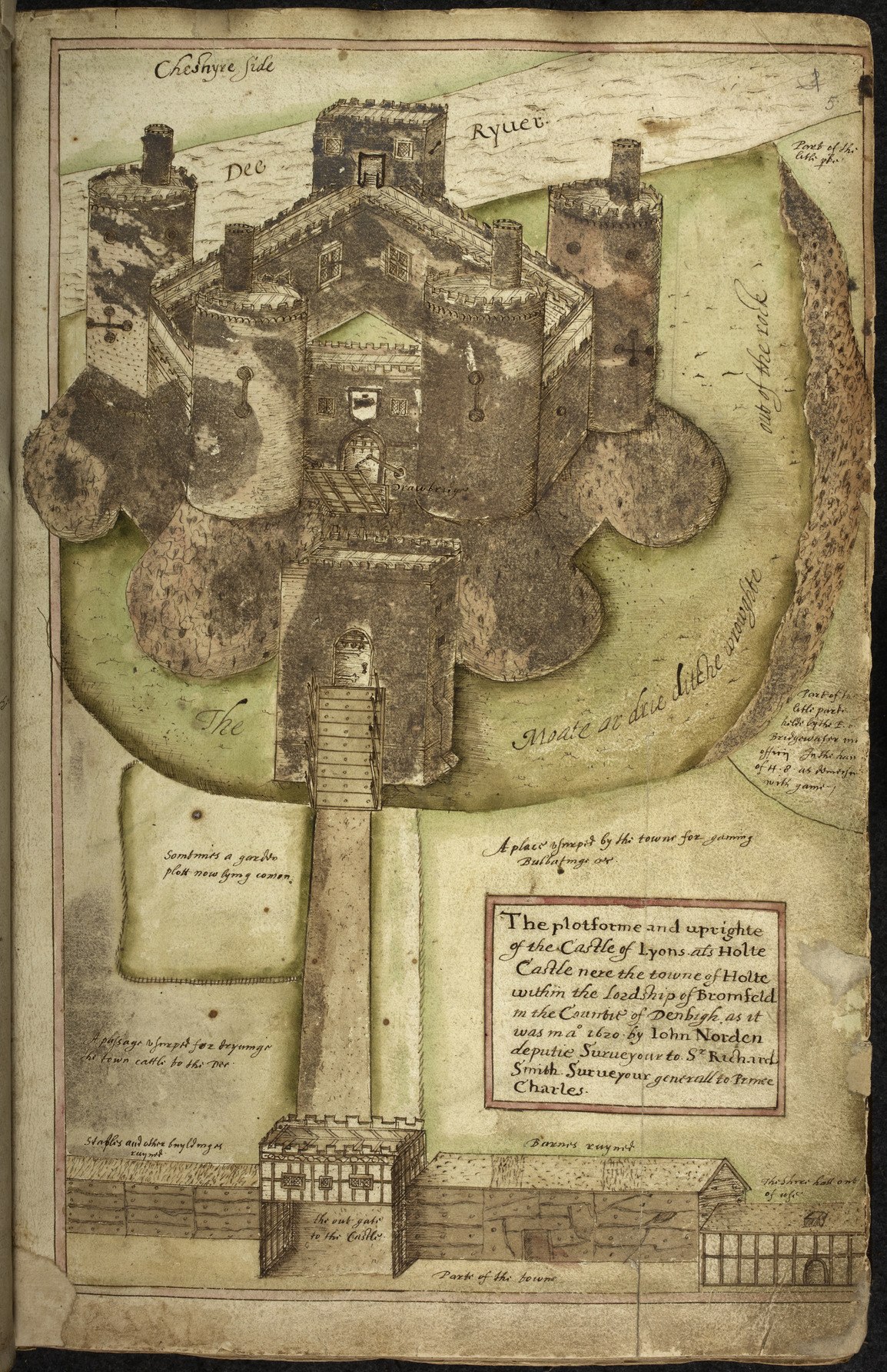
Holt Castle, built by the lord of Bromfield and Yale, John de Warenne, Earl of Surrey, who lost the Battle of Stirling against William Wallace

The Lordship of Bromfield and Yale was formed in 1282 by the merger of the medieval commotes of Marford, Wrexham and Yale. It was part of the Welsh Marches and was within the cantref of Maelor in the former Kingdom of Powys.

The marcher lordship was originally bestowed to the Earls of Surrey of the Warenne family, being seized from the inheritance of lord Madog Crypl, son of prince Gruffudd Fychan I. These lordships historically belonged to the Princes of Powys Fadog, Lords of Yale and Dinas Bran, members of the Royal House of Mathrafal.

== History ==
In 1347 it passed to the Earls of Arundel of the FitzAlan family, a branch of the House of Howard. In 1415 the male line went extinct and the lordship was divided between three and eventually just two branches of the female line of the Fitzalans.

From Elizabeth Fitzalan, Duchess of Norfolk, co-heiress, it passed into the hands of her grandson, Sir William Stanley, Lord Chamberlain, through the grant of king Henry Tudor, but after Stanley was charged for high treason, the lordship was forfeited to the Crown under the Principality of Wales, becoming once more a royal lordship. Sir Stanley was at the time the richest man in England.

In 1534, Henry VIII awarded it to his son Henry FitzRoy, Duke of Richmond, half-brother of Elizabeth I, but he died two years later, having Henry awarding it once more to a family member, this time to Lord Admiral Thomas Seymour, husband of Queen Catherine Parr.

In the records of 1630 and 1649, under Charles Stuart, Prince of Wales, we see the lordship of Bromfield and Yale containing 16 Manors and 63 townships, with John Egerton, 1st Earl of Bridgewater, recorded as Chief Steward. The lordship was previously in the possession of King Charles II and Queen Henrietta Maria de Bourbon, aunt of Louis XIV of Versailles, and daughter of Queen Marie de' Medici.

During the reign of Charles I, the land mineral rights were sold, as the king was desperate for money after losing his parliament. The buyer was Sir Richard Grosvenor of Eaton Hall, ancestor of the Dukes of Westminster, and proprietor of the Grosvenor Estate. In the early 2000s, Queen's Counsel David Yale of the Yale family was involved in an arbitration case with the 6th Duke and the Crown Estate regarding its mineral rights.

Notable chief stewards and proprietors of the lordship have included John de Warenne, Earl of Surrey, who lost the Battle of Stirling against William Wallace, Earl Richard Fitzalan of Arundel Castle, and Charles Brandon, 1st Duke of Suffolk, brother-in-law of Henry VIII.

Two other previous owners were also executed, being Henry Stafford, 2nd Duke of Buckingham, implicated with the Princes in the Tower, and Tudor courtier William Brereton, accused of adultery with Queen Anne Boleyn.

The lordship followed the law of the March rather than the law of England or the law of Wales.

== Bibliography ==
- R. R. Davies. "The Law of the March". Welsh History Review = Cylchgrawn Hanes Cymru 5 (1970): 1–30.
- Thomas Peter Ellis. The First Extent of Bromfield and Yale, A.D. 1315. London: Honourable Society of Cymmrodorion, 1924.
- Derrick Pratt. "Anatomy of Conquest: Bromfield and Yale, 1277–84." Transactions of the Denbighshire Historical Society 56 (2008): 17–58.
- Derrick Pratt. "Medieval Bromfield and Yale: The Machinery of Justice." Transactions of the Denbighshire Historical Society 53 (2004): 19–78.
- Michael Rogers. The Welsh Marcher Lordship of Bromfield and Yale, 1282–1485. PhD diss. University of Wales, 1992.
