= Tudur Penllyn =

Tudur Penllyn (fl. c. 1420 – 1490) was a Welsh language poet during the time of the Beirdd yr Uchelwyr, the professional poets of the late Middle Ages.

Tudur's place of birth is uncertain, but he was probably brought up in the Hundred of Penllyn, centred on Llandderfel, Merioneth (Penllyn is a pen-name or bardic name rather than a surname: his full name under the Welsh patronymic system was Tudur ap Ieuan ap Iorwerth Foel). Little is known of his background although he did trace his ancestry from Meirion Goch, a nobleman of Edeirnion, and was of the minor gentry class. As an adult he lived in the parish of Llanuwchllyn at Caer-Gai, where the manor house he occupied still exists as a farm.

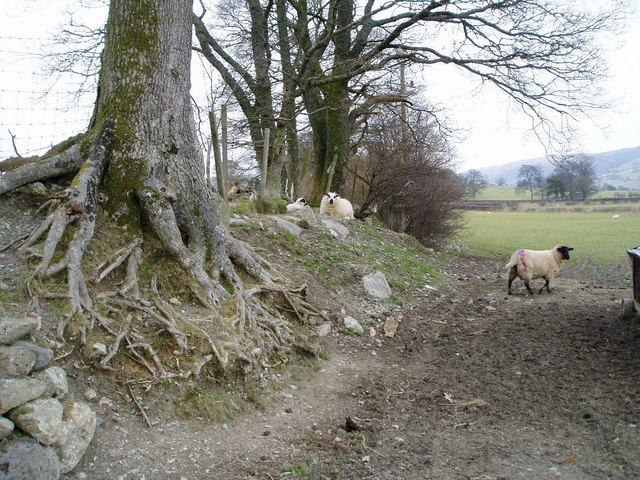
Sheep on the slopes beneath Caer-Gai, where Tudur Penllyn farmed. Tudur worked as a drover, trading the wool of his flocks in English markets.

Tudur lived through the Wars of the Roses, in which his patrons (notably Rheinallt ap Gruffudd of Mold, also a patron of Lewys Glyn Cothi, and Dafydd Siencyn, a supporter of Jasper Tudor) mainly adhered to the Lancastrian party. As well as travelling throughout Wales as a poet, Tudur seems to have worked as a drover, grazier, and trader in wool. His fellow poet Guto'r Glyn chided him in humorous verse after he failed to assist Guto in a disastrous droving venture (he also gives a clue to Tudur's personal appearance, describing him as long-haired in comparison to Guto's own baldness).

Tudur Penllyn's surviving poems illustrate a range of themes: poems in praise of noblemen who fought against the English; religious poems, including penitential poems and poems in praise of holy places; and meditations on life and suffering. However he would also take on humorous or amorous themes as the occasion arose: one cywydd attributed to him is written in alternate Welsh and English sections, and depicts the poet attempting to seduce an unwilling Englishwoman, exploiting their mutual incomprehension for comic effect.

Tudur was married to Gwerful Fychan (Gwerful ferch Ieuan Fychan ap Ieuan ap Hywel y Gadair ap Gruffudd ap Madog ap Rhirid Flaidd, not be confused with Gwerful Mechain), who was herself a poet. Their son, Ieuan ap Tudur Penllyn, also became a poet.

== See also ==
- Tudur Penllyn at Wikisource
