= Madog Crupl =

Welsh nobleman (died c. 1305)

Coat of arms of Powys Fadog

Madog Crupl ap Gruffydd Fychan (c. 1275 – 11 November 1305) was lord of Glyndyfrdwy in north-east Wales.

== Biography ==
Madog was still a child at the death of his father, Prince Gruffydd Fychan in 1289, so that the lands were placed in the custody of Queen Eleanor of Castile by the Justiciar of North Wales, Otto de Grandson, one of the Savoyard knights.

Madog was initially put into the wardship of John de Warenne, 6th Earl of Surrey, and was the heir of the Lordship of Bromfield and Yale, and Castell Dinas Bran from his father, which would be taken from him during his youth by Edward Longshanks and be awarded to the Earl of Surrey, one the king's relatives.

Madog's brothers were then murdered in the River Dee, Wales, by their guardians John de Warenne, 6th Earl of Surrey of Holt Castle, and Roger Mortimer, 1st Baron Mortimer of Chirk Castle, after having obtained the children's wardship and territories.

Madog was thereafter put in the wardship of Reginald de Grey, Justice of Chester and then Thomas of Macclesfield. Madog ap Gruffydd asked the king for a suitable provision to be made for him, and seems to have been granted some of his father's lands. These apparently consisted of Glyndyfrdwy and half of the commote of Cynllaith, comprising the area around Sycharth, and around 1300, he was made the Baron of the Welsh Marches.

Madog married Gwenllian, daughter of Ithel Fychan of Halkin and had a son Gruffydd of Rhuddallt, who was married on 8 July 1304 at the age of six to Elizabeth, daughter of John LeStrange, Lord of Knockin Castle. This early marriage into a powerful Marcher family may have been a strategic plan to protect the young boy's inheritance by an ailing Madog. When Gruffyd came of age, he succeeded his father as a Marcher Lord and still retained, to some degree, most of the privileges of a ruling Welsh prince.

== Death and burial ==
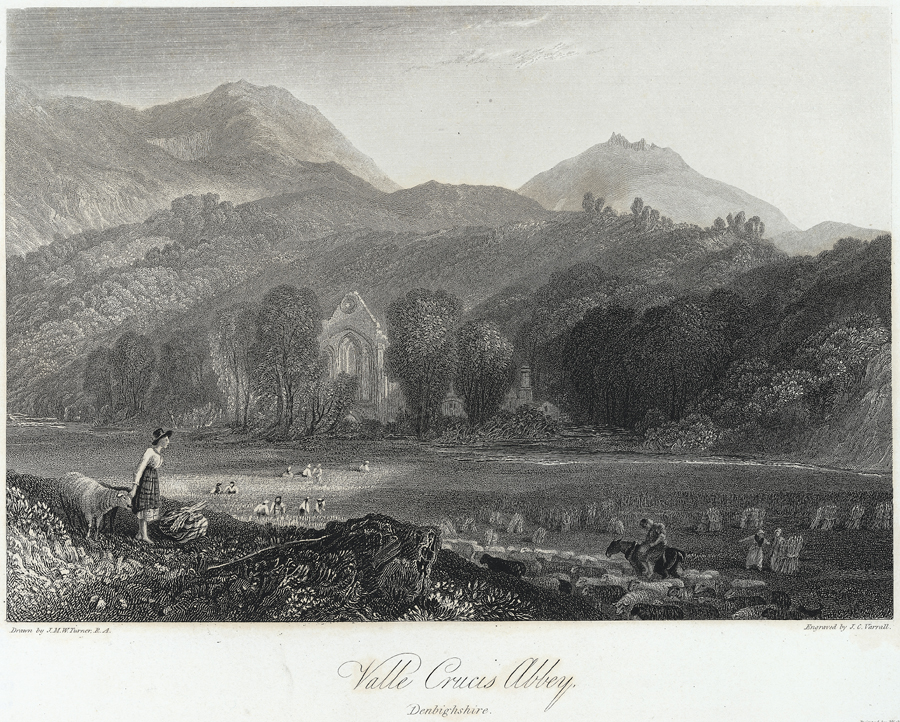
Valle Crucis Abbey, Denbighshire, with Castell Dinas Bran at the top of the hill

Madog died on 11 November 1305 in his manor of Rhuddallt, probably in Glyn Dyfrdwy.

He was buried at Valle Crucis Abbey, Llangollen, an abbey founded by his grandfather, Prince Madog ap Gruffydd Maelor. In 1956 the heraldic tomb slab of Madog was found at the Abbey and is now on display there. It is said to be the best preserved example of a stone monument in North Wales from this period. The carving shows a shield with a lion rampant, surrounded by the inscription in the upper half of the slab. A sheathed sword is diagonally set behind the shield and a spear runs vertically along the slab. The whole is decorated with vine leaves and bunches of grapes. The inscription reads:

HIC IACET: MA/DOC': FIL': GRIFINI: DCI: VYCHAN

This translates as: Here lies Madog son of Gruffydd called Fychan.

== Posterity ==
Following Madog's death, Gruffydd of Rhuddallt became a ward of his father-in-law, John LeStrange, who died in 1309. Custody of his lands was then granted to Edmund Hakluyt (Hakelute), who sold the wardship to Baron Roger Mortimer of Chirk Castle. However, Gruffydd probably stayed with the LeStrange family, as Roger Mortimer disputed the validity of Gruffydd's marriage in 1315. In 1318, a formal inquiry was held and confirmed the union. Gruffydd ultimately obtained possession of his lands in March 1321 having come of age and having done homage to the king, Edward II.

Gruffydd held the two lordships by Welsh barony (pennaeth), which required him to serve in the king's army with his men at the king's expense. In 1328, he settled his lands on himself and his wife Elizabeth Le Strange in tail. In 1332 he had custody of the manor of Ellesmere as well as Ellesmere Castle, recently granted to his brother-in-law Eubulus le Strange, 1st Baron Strange. He died sometime after 1343.

Gruffydd was probably succeeded by his son Gruffydd Fychan II who is reported to have died shortly before 1370. He was the father of Owain Glyndŵr and Lord Tudor Glendower.
