= Gruffydd ap Madog Fychan =

Gruffydd ap Madog Fychan was according to some sources the son of Madog Fychan the hereditary Prince of Powys Fadog between 1304 and c. 1325.

== Biography ==
It seems unlikely that Gruffydd ap Madog Fychan ever inherited the throne of Powys Fadog and he may have died before his father. He was married to Elizabeth Strange and was the grandfather of Owain Glyndŵr.

His son, Gruffydd Fychan II appears to have inherited the titles Lord of Glyndyfrdwy and Cynllaith Owain directly from Madog Fychan sometime around 1325.
