= Gwerful Fychan =

15th-century Welsh poet

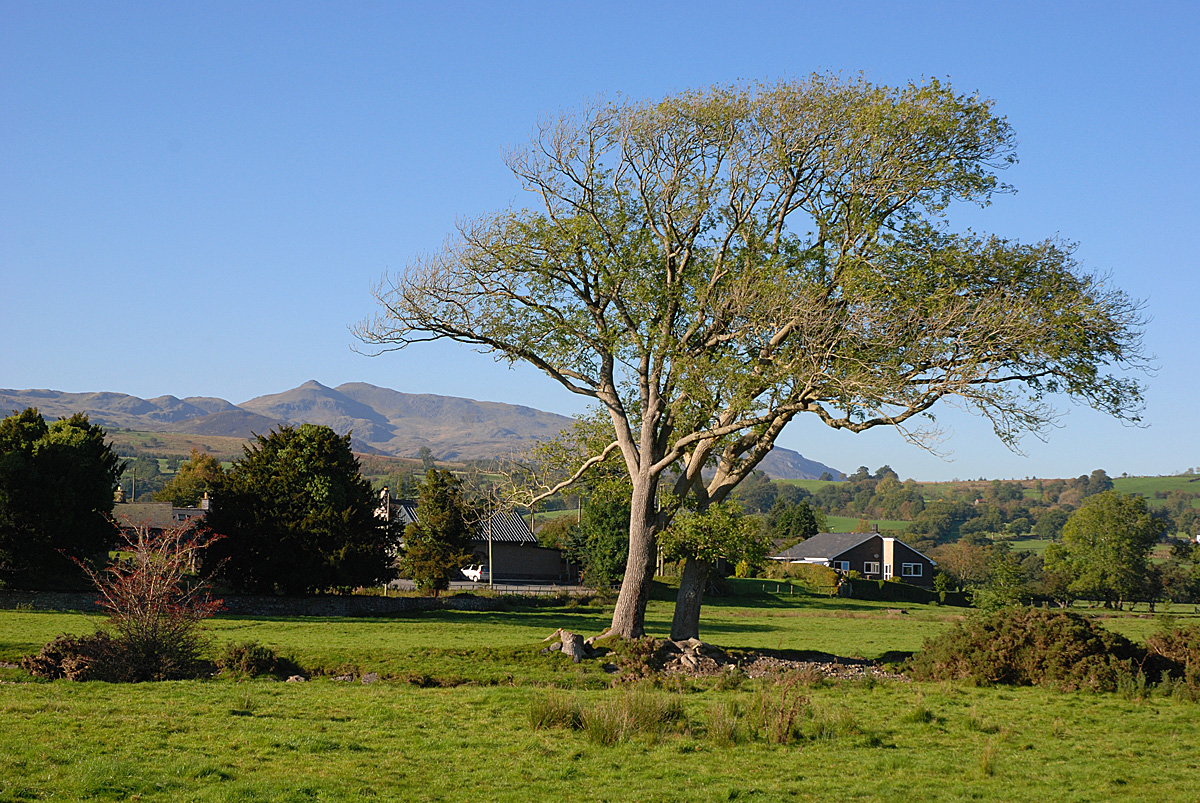
Fields near Llanuwchllyn. Gwerful inherited lands at Caer-Gai, on the low hills in the middle distance

Gwerful Fychan (fl. 1420–1490) was a poet during the period of the Welsh Beirdd yr Uchelwyr during the Late Middle Ages. She came from a noble family, her full name in genealogies being given as Gwerful ferch Ieuan Fychan ap Ieuan ap Hywel y Gadair ap Gruffudd ap Madog ap Rhirid Flaidd. She was the heiress of the mansion of Caer-Gai, near Llanuwchllyn, Merioneth. The name Fychan was later anglicised as Vaughan.

Gwerful was married to Tudur Penllyn, a drover and wool-trader but also a notable poet, and their son Ieuan also wrote poetry which survives in a number of sources. They may also have had a daughter, Gwenllian, though her poetic abilities have been harder to prove.

No work definitely ascribed to Gwerful Fychan is known to survive, but the cywydd titled Cywydd y March Glas (the Grey Horse), sometimes ascribed either to Gwerful Mechain or Tudur Aled, has been suggested as her work. Some early antiquaries confuse her with Gwerful Mechain, who was a contemporary. Her memory persisted in the area of Llanuwchllyn as late as the 20th century and a variety of traditional verses were claimed as by her.
