= Llygad Gŵr =

Llygad Gŵr (fl. 1268 or 1258 – c. 1293,) was a Welsh-language poet in the court of Llywelyn ap Gruffudd.

His surviving works are a sequence of five awdlau for Llywelyn and four poems that praise the dynasty of Powys Fadog.

In his poetry, he envisions Wales as a single united nation with Llywelyn as its head and supreme power: "the true king of Wales". This has been called "the most 'nationalist' poetry in Welsh before the days of Glyn Dwr".

== Sources ==
- Lloyd, David Myrddin (1959). "Llygad Gŵr". Dictionary of Welsh Biography. National Library of Wales.
- J. Lloyd-Jones, 'The Court Poets of the Welsh Princes', Proceedings of the British Academy, 1948
- P. I. Lynch, 'Court Poetry, Power and Politics' in The Welsh King and His Court pp. 167–190, edited by T. M. Charles-Edwards, Morfydd E. Owen and Paul Russell, University of Wales Press, Cardiff, 2000.
