= John Lestrange =

Anglo-Norman Marcher Lord

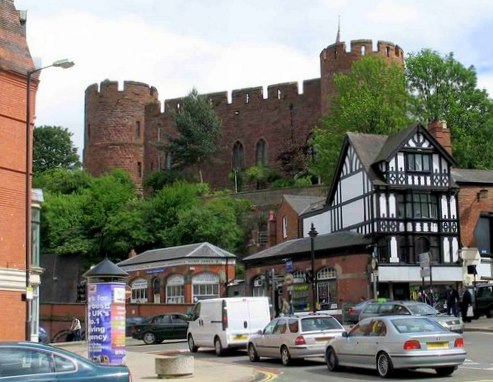
Shrewsbury Castle, held by John Lestrange

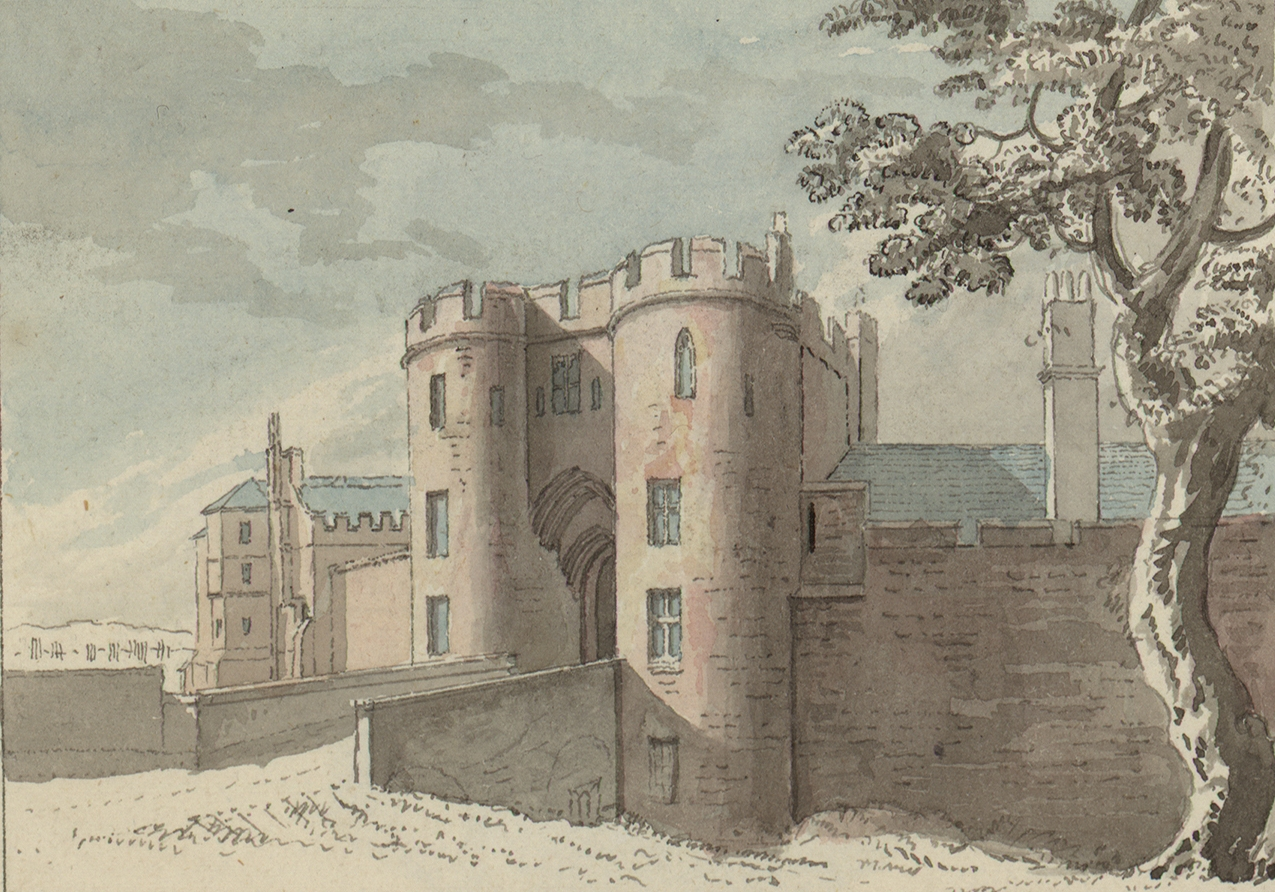
Castle Gate at Chester, where Lestrange was Justiciar

John III Lestrange (died 1269), of Knockin in Shropshire, was a marcher lord, landowner, administrator and soldier. He was also the Constable and Justice of Chester from 1240 to 1245, and fought the Second Barons' War with king Henry III of England.

== Origins ==
The surname of this family indicates that they were "foreign" and therefore originally not from Normandy. Various proposals have been made about their origins, including Brittany, Lorraine, and Anjou. They first appear in Norfolk where Rolland, Roald or Rivallon Lestrange (died before 1158) was a tenant there of Alan fitz Flaald and married Mathilde (or Maud) the heiress of one part of the two parts of Hunstanton.

Roland's son John I Lestrange (died before 1178), twice sheriff of Shropshire, held the castles of Shrewsbury and Bridgnorth for King Henry II in 1174.

John I's son John II Lestrange (died 1223) and his three other sons all acquired lands in Shropshire and over the Welsh border in Powys, with John II making his headquarters at Knockin (pronounced Nuckin) where he and his successors built a castle, church and village. He served as sheriff of Shropshire and of Staffordshire. He also joined his neighbour, Robert Corbet, on the Third Crusade.

== Career ==
John III was the son of John II and served in 1214 in King John's failed campaign in Poitou, taking part in the Battle of Roche-au-Moine.

In 1231 he was granted by King Henry III the fiefdom of Wrockwardine, and between 1233 and 1240 was in turn constable of the royal castles at Montgomery, Shrewsbury, Bridgnorth and Chester.

In 1245 he served as the king's negotiator in the military campaign against Dafydd ap Llywelyn, Prince of Gwynedd. During the rebellion of Simon de Montfort in 1264, he backed the king in the Second Barons' War. After serving like his father as Sheriff of both Shropshire and Staffordshire, he died in 1269.

== Family ==
He married Lucy, daughter of Robert Tregoz. They had four sons and two daughters:

- John IV (died 1276), who was father of

- John V, deemed to be 1st Baron Strange.

- Hamo (died 1273), who married Queen Isabella of Ibelin, Lady of Beirut, widow of Hugh II, King of Cyprus and Regent of Jerusalem,
- Roger (died 1311), who was summoned to Parliament as a baron in 1295 but left no heir.
- Robert, who was father of

- Fulk (died 1324), Seneschal of Aquitaine in 1322 who became 1st Baron Strange of Blackmere.

- Hawise, who married Prince Gruffydd ap Gwenwynwyn.
- Catherine, who married Robert Corbet. Their daughter Joan married Hawise's son, Owen de la Pole.
