= Gruffudd Fychan =

Gruffudd Fychan (antiquarian spelling: Gruffydd Fychan) could refer to:

- Gruffudd Fychan I, Prince of Powys Fadog (reigned 1277–1284)
- Gruffudd Fychan II (c. 1330–1369), Lord of Glyndyfrdwy and Cynllaith and father of Owain Glyndŵr, Prince of Wales
- Gruffudd Fychan ap Gruffudd ab Ednyfed (14th century), a Welsh-language poet
- Gruffudd Vychan (c. 1395–1447), Welsh knight and supporter of Owain Glyndŵr
