= Owain ap Gruffudd ap Gwenwynwyn =

Welsh marcher lord and heir to the principality of Powys Wenwynwyn

- A tapestry commemorating the granting of a market-charter to Machynlleth in 1291, presented to Owain by Edward I
- Born: c. 1257; England
- Died: c. 1293 (aged 35–36)
- Noble family: Lleision
- Spouse: Joan Corbet
- Issue: Gruffudd de la Pole; Hawys ferch Owain
- Father: Gruffudd ap Gwenwynwyn
- Mother: Hawise Lestrange

Arms of Powys

Owain ap Gruffydd ap Gwenwynwyn (c. 1257 – c. 1293) or Owen de la Pole was the heir presumptive to the Welsh principality of Powys Wenwynwyn until 1283 when it was abolished by the Parliament of Shrewsbury. He became the 1st Lord of Powis after the death of his father Gruffydd ap Gwenwynwyn c. 1287. He is not related to the English de la Pole family descended from William de la Pole, Chief Baron of the Exchequer in the following century, later Earls and Dukes of Suffolk.

== Early life and family ==
Owain was born in England sometime after his father Gruffydd ap Gwenwynwyn was driven into exile there in 1257 by Llywelyn ap Gruffudd, ruler of the Kingdom of Gwynedd. It was during this exile that his father probably adopted the surname de la Pole meaning "of the Pool" and referring to the old name for Welshpool which had become his family's capital. Owain's mother was Hawise Lestrange, daughter of John Lestrange. His uncles were Hamo le Strange and Roger le Strange, Baron Strange, and his cousins were John le Strange, 1st Baron Strange of Knockyn and Fulk le Strange, 1st Baron Strange of Blackmere. His maternal aunt was queen Isabella, Lady of Beirut, a granddaughter of the Duke of Athens, Guy I de la Roche, and descendant of both Balian of Ibelin and the Byzantine emperor John II Komnenos.

== Military career ==
In 1263 following the Treaty of Montgomery his father was restored to some of his lands in return for agreeing to pay homage to Llywelyn as Prince of Wales. However, good relations between Powys Wenwynwyn and Gwynedd were short-lived as Owain and his father were soon implicated in an assassination attempt on the Prince of Wales in 1274. This led to Owain and his father fleeing to Shrewsbury where they both led border raids against the Principality of Wales on behalf of the English crown.

Following Llywelyn's defeat at the hands of Edward I of England in 1277 Owain returned to Wales alongside his father whose lands had been restored. They soon became embroiled in a border dispute with Llywelyn which was one of the catalysts for a renewed campaign by the princes of Gwynedd against English domination. In 1284, following the Conquest of Wales by Edward I, the de la Pole family surrendered their princely pretensions, but received back their principality in "free barony" as the marcher lordship of Powys. Owain's father Gruffydd died around 1286.

In 1290, Owain endowed his four younger brothers with portions of the lordship, which were to be held for him as his feudal tenants. Two brothers (who were priests) received their portions for life, the shares of the other two were to revert to Owain on failure of issue. Only William left children and they enjoyed the Lordship of Mawddwy and the majority of Mallwyd for several generations, before it was divided between coheirs in the early 16th century. One of the coheiresses was Elisabeth de Burgh, who married Sir John Lingen (d. 1505), and left descendants from this princely house.

== Personal life ==
Owain married Joan Corbet, the daughter of Robert Corbet and Catherine Le Strange, members of the Corbet family; together they had a daughter and probably five sons:

- Griffith de la Pole, 2nd Lord of Powis, died childless in 1309.
- Hawise de la Pole, known as Hawys Gadarn and "The Lady of Powys" (Powys, 25 July 1290 – Grey Friars, 1349); inherited the lordship in 1309. She married John Charleton, 1st Baron Cherleton, (1268–1353), and their descendants held the lordship until the late 16th century.

He lived the latter part of his life in Powys Castle in Welshpool and died c. 1293. After his death the lordship of Powis passed to his son Griffith, who died in childless in 1309, and then to his daughter Hawise and her descendants from her marriage to John Charleton, 1st Baron Cherleton.
