= Hawise Lestrange =

Daughter of John Lestrange

- Matrix of Hawise found in Oswestry, reading S' HAWISIE DN̄E KEVEOLOC 'Seal of Hawise, Lady of Cyfeiliog'
- Born: c. 1228 poss. Knockin Castle, Shropshire
- Died: November 1310
- Noble family: Lestrange
- Spouse: Gruffudd ap Gwenwynwyn
- Issue: Margaret; Owain de la Pole; Llywelyn; Gwilym; Dafydd; Ieuan; Gruffudd Fychan
- Father: John III Lestrange
- Mother: Lucy Tregoz

Hawise Lestrange (died 1310) was the daughter of the Marcher lord John Lestrange (d.1269) of Great Ness, Cheswardine and Knockin (Shropshire). Married at a young age to the ruler of southern Powys, Gruffudd ap Gwenwynwyn, she became a key figure in border affairs and in the management of her family and estates until her death at a great age. She was deeply implicated in a plot to overthrow the prince of Wales, Llywelyn ap Gruffudd, in 1274, and with her husband sided with Edward I in the English king's conquest of Wales.

== Early life and marriage ==
The date of Hawise's birth is unknown, but she was probably still a teenager when she was married to Gruffudd around 1242. In that year that Gruffudd gained the king's permission to dower Hawise with land in the royal manor of Ashford in Derbyshire. Hawise and Gruffudd are unlikely to have been complete strangers at marriage, for Gruffudd - part-English by birth - had spent most of his life to that point in exile in England and the Marches. His mother Margaret was a member of the prominent Corbet family from the nearby Marcher lordship of Caus, and appears to have considerable contact with her son and daughter-in-law until her death around 1250.

During the early years of the marriage, the couple resided mainly in the castle of Pool or Powis Castle, lying to the west of the town of Welshpool. Gruffudd served Henry III loyally, for which he received various rewards and inducements to further loyalty. In 1248 Hawise received two stags from the king, perhaps for her own loyal service. In 1257, however, Llywelyn ap Gruffudd, prince of Gwynedd and would-be ruler of Wales at large, invaded southern Powys and Hawise and Gruffudd were driven out. Finding a lack of royal support for their plight, in 1263 Gwenwynwyn transferred his allegiance to Llywelyn.

== Attitude toward Llywelyn ap Gruffudd ==
Although her husband allied himself to Llywelyn ap Gruffudd in 1263, Hawise's natal family were (with one or two exceptions) notable allies of the Crown. Hawise herself seems to have remained hostile to Llywelyn for much of her career.

=== Attempt to overthrow Llywelyn ===
By 1274, Gruffudd ap Gwenwynwyn was firmly back in royal favour. In that year his family became involved in an attempt on the life of Llywelyn ap Gruffudd. Hawise and her eldest son, Owain, were leading participants in the plot, which also involved Llywelyn's disaffected younger brother, Dafydd ap Gruffudd. The intention had been for Dafydd and Owain to murder Llywelyn at his court and for Dafydd to take his place, while Owain would marry Dafydd's daughter and take the commotes of Ceri and Cydewain as a marriage settlement. Ultimately the plot failed, foiled by a snowstorm that prevented the would-be assassins from carrying out their mission, and Llywelyn's suspicions were aroused. Owain was taken into captivity. Our knowledge of Hawise's involvement comes from a confession allegedly made by Owain in the presence of the bishop of Bangor and others, and set down in a letter written by the Bangor clergy to the archbishop of Canterbury in the spring of 1276. In this confession, Owain identified his mother as the designated guardian of the conspirators' plot documents, keeping them under lock and key in her own private chest in the family residence at Pool. The historian Emma Cavell argues that Hawise's status as a married woman, and her resulting centrality to family and household management, made her an"ideal focus for the protection and/or transmission of privileged information."

=== Conquest of Wales ===
There is no explicit mention of Hawise Lestrange in any of the contemporary sources relating to the killing of Llywelyn ap Gruffudd, and the fall of native Wales, in December 1282. Yet, the pattern of her activities to that point, combined with the clear, central involvement of her husband, several of her sons, and several neighbours in tracking Llywelyn's movements and engaging him in the field, make it highly likely that she did play her part. She also had a kinswoman, Margaret Lestrange, who was married to a prominent defector from Llywelyn's court, and who may have been among those channeling sensitive information back and forth between Gwynedd and the Marches in the run-up to Llywelyn's defeat.

== Middle and later years ==
The division of the barony of Powys after Gruffudd ap Gwenwynwyn's death.

From the 1270s Hawise began to take a more prominent role in the management of the family estates, in part perhaps because she was much younger than her aging, though still active, husband Gruffudd. Around 1270 she took personal control of her brother Hamon's manor of Church Stretton, Shropshire, while he went on crusade, and ultimately assumed full responsibility for the manor in her own right when Hamon died on crusade. She was a figure of family authority, seemingly central to the arrangements made both for her children's marriages and for the future of her husband's patrimonial lands. In providing for the family after his death, Gruffudd ap Gwenwynwyn made sure his Hawise's dower was preserved. In 1277 he issued a charter to his wife granting her dower interests then included the township of Buttington, the commotes of Deuddwr and Caereinion and pastures in Cyfeiliog and Arwystli. Certain of these territories had also been held in dower by her mother-in-law Margaret Corbet.

After Gruffudd's death in 1286, Hawise ruled her family and much of their territory with something of an iron fist, becoming involved in (among other things) the determined harassment of her daughter-in-law Joan, the widow of her eldest son Owain. By 1302, however, Hawise was finding estate administration a burden, and between that year and 1306 she was granted permission by the crown to present her debts at the Exchequer of Chester, rather than at Westminster, 'for her easement'. In 1308 she relinquished the custody of the barony of Pool to her only surviving son, Gruffudd Fychan.

Hawise Lestrange died in November 1310, probably aged in her mid-late eighties. There is evidence to suggest that she was buried at the Cistercian Abbey of Strata Marcella Abbey, the foundation of her husband's ancestor Owain Cyfeiliog.

== Family ==
Hawise's first child with Gruffudd was a daughter, Margaret, possibly named after her mother-in-law Margaret Corbet. Several sons followed, of which six sons survived into adulthood:

- Margaret, married Fulk, son of Fulk FitzWarin of Whittington
- Owain 'de la Pole', married Joan Corbet
- Llywelyn, married Sybil Turberville, and widow of Grimbald Pauncefoot, a knight of Edward I
- Gruffudd Fychan, married a kinswoman of Roger Springhose of Shropshire
- Gwilym, married Gwladus, daughter of Sir Howel Y Pedolau
- Dafydd, a cleric
- Ieuan, a cleric
