= Fulk le Strange, 1st Baron Strange of Blackmere =

13th-14th century English noble

Arms of Fulk, Baron Strange of Blackmere: Argent, two lions passant gules

Fulk le Strange, 1st Baron Strange of Blackmere (died 23 January 1324) was an English noble. He fought in the wars in Gascony and Scotland. He was a signatory of the Baron's Letter to Pope Boniface VIII in 1301.

== Biography ==
He was a younger son of Robert le Strange (a son of John Lestrange) and Eleanor de Blanchmunster. After the death of his older brother John, Fulk inherited in 1289 lands in Wrockwardine, Ellesmere and the other possessions of his family in Shropshire. In 1294 he took part in the campaign in Gascony. From 1298 he took part during the Scottish Wars of Independence in several campaigns during the reigns of kings Edward I and Edward II. Through writ of summons he attended parliament in 1308 and 1309 as Baron Strange of Blackmere. He was appointed on 26 May 1322 as Seneschal of Gascony. He died in January 1324 and was succeeded by his son John.

== Marriage and issue ==
Fulk married Eleonore, daughter of John Giffard, 1st Baron Giffard and his wife Maud de Clifford, and had the following known issue:

- Fulk le Strange
- John le Strange
- Elizabeth le Strange, married Robert Corbet
