= Rhiwaedog =

Ancient estate in North Wales

Coordinates: 52.8789°N 3.5131°W

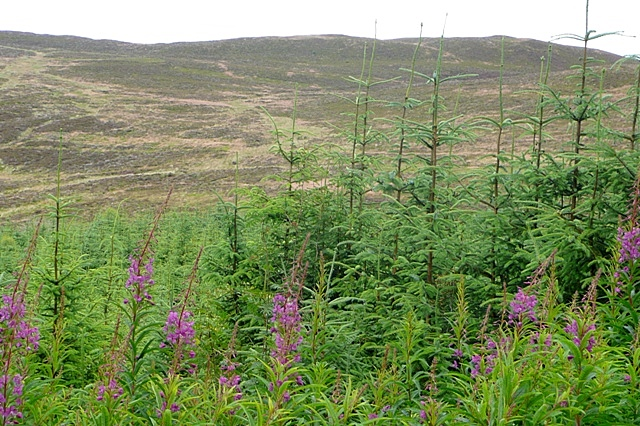
Rhiwaedog-is-afon Part of Y Berwyn National Nature Reserve, taken from within Penllyn Forest.

Rhiwaedog is the name of an ancient estate in North Wales, located in the Penllyn forest near Bala, Gwynedd. It gives its name today to two hills, Rhiwaedog-is-Afon and Rhiwaedog-uwch-Afon, meaning "Rhiwaedog below the river" and "Rhiwaedog above the river" respectively. There is also the ancient manor house Plas Rhiwaedog, from which Rhirid Flaidd (also known as Rhirid ap Gwrgenau) (fl. 1160) ruled his demesne.

== Traditional history ==
According to Welsh tradition, Rhirid was the son of Gwrgenau, who is supported by an obscure and doubtful pedigree going back to Cunedda Wledig. The appellation of blaidd (wolf) was inherited from his maternal grandmother, Haer, daughter and heiress of Gillyn, son of Blaidd Rhudd (meaning "the Bloody Wolf") of Gest in Eifionydd.

There are a number of traditions and legends associated with Rhiwaedog. One such legend speaks of an egg-sized crystal which was passed from generation to generation, and is said to have had the power to foretell the death of the head of the household when its brilliant colour became clouded.
