= J. Beverley Smith =

Welsh historian (1931–2024)

Jenkyn Beverley Smith, FLSW, FRHistS (27 September 1931 – 19 February 2024), published as J. Beverley Smith, was a Welsh historian of medieval Wales, who was successively Sir John Williams Professor of Welsh History (1986–1995), Research Professor of Welsh History (1995–1999) and Emeritus Professor (1999–2024) at Aberystwyth University.

== Career ==
Born on 27 September 1931 at Gorseinon, Smith completed his undergraduate and master's degrees at the University College of Wales, Aberystwyth (later Aberystwyth University). After completing two years of National Service in 1956, Smith joined the Board of Celtic Studies at the University of Wales as a researcher, before spending two years as the Assistant Keeper of the Department of Manuscripts and Records at the National Library of Wales from 1958 to 1960. He then returned to his alma mater as a lecturer. Promotions followed: in 1967 he became a senior lecturer, and in 1978 reader. His appointment as Sir John Williams Professor of Welsh History followed in 1986, and he remained in that post until 1995, when he was made Research Professor in Welsh History. After retiring four years later, he remained at Aberystwyth as an emeritus professor. Smith was also co-editor of the Bulletin of the Board of Celtic Studies (1972–96; from 1994, the journal became the Studia Celtica) and served its Chief Editor from 1996 to 2010.

Smith served on a number of public bodies; he was a member of the council of the National Library of Wales from 1974 to 1984, and also served on the Board of Celtic Studies at the University of Wales for 42 years from 1965 (as chairman from 1985 to 1991). He was a Commissioner of the Royal Commission on Ancient and Historical Monuments for Wales from 1984 to 1999, the last eight years of which he was its chairman.

Smith died on 19 February 2024, at the age of 92. He was survived by his wife, Llinos, and two sons, Robert and Huw.

== Honours ==
In 1967, Smith was elected a Fellow of the Royal Historical Society (FRHistS), and in 2013 he was also elected a Fellow of the Learned Society of Wales (FLSW). He was the dedicatee of a festschrift edited by Ralph A. Griffiths and Phillipp Schofield: Wales and the Welsh in the Middle Ages: Essays Presented to J. Beverley Smith (University of Wales Press, 2011).

== Selected publications ==
- (Co-edited with T. Jones Pierce) Medieval Welsh Society, Selected Essays by T. Jones Pierce (University of Wales Press, 1972).
- Llywelyn ap Gruffudd, Tywysog Cymru (University of Wales Press, 1986).
- (Edited with Geraint Jenkins) Politics and Society in Wales 1840–1922: Essays in Honour of Ieuan Gwynedd Jones (University of Wales Press, 1988).
- Llywelyn ap Gruffudd, Prince of Wales (University of Wales Press, 1998; 2nd edition, 2014).
- (Co-edited with Llinos Beverley Smith) History of Merioneth, vol. II, The Middle Ages (Merioneth Historical and Record Society, 2001).
