= Madog Fychan =

Madog Fychan was a member of the family of Princes of Powys Fadog, though he never gained the title, being brother of Gruffydd Maelor II. He was an ally to Dafydd ap Llywelyn in his campaign to attack English possessions in Wales in 1245 and sided with Llywelyn ap Gruffydd in 1258 in his claim to the title of Prince of Wales. He died in December 1269.

== Ancestry and ambiguity ==
Some sources ciate Madog Fychan ap Madog ap Gruffydd, also known as Madog Fychan, as the brother of Gruffydd Maelor II and grandson of Gruffydd Maelor I, Prince of Powys Fadog, existing c.1230–1269. Other genealogical tables insert another generation lower down with Madog Fychan as son of Madog Crypl (c. 1275–1304/6). However, it is more likely that Madog Crypl's son was Gruffydd, who was succeeded by Gruffydd Fychan II, the father of Owain Glyndŵr.
