= Gruffudd Maelor (died 1269) =

Prince of Powys Fadog, son of Prince Madog ap Gruffydd Maelor

Coat of arms of Powys Fadog

Gruffydd Maelor (died 1269) was a Prince of Powys Fadog. He reigned for 33 years and married into the House of Stanley. Following the Anglo-Welsh Treaty of Montgomery, he submitted to Llywelyn ap Gruffudd, Prince of Wales.

== Lineage ==
He was the eldest son of Prince Madog ap Gruffydd Maelor and inherited his father's lands and title in partible succession along with his four brothers Gruffudd Iâl, Maredudd, Hywel and Madog Fychan.

His father's policy of alliance with the large and powerful Gwynedd changed over his 33-year reign (1236-1269); pressure from Gwynedd, and Gruffydd's marriage to the daughter of an English landowner, caused him to seek support from the English king.

However, support from England failed to arrive and in 1258 he was forced to submit to Llywelyn ap Gruffudd.

Around 1260, Gruffydd started the construction of Castell Dinas Brân in the Dee Valley. Afterwards, Llywelyn was recognised as Prince of Wales under the terms of the 1267 Treaty of Montgomery and Gruffydd was confined to his castle for the rest of his life.

== Marriage ==
He married Emma (1224 – c. 1278), daughter of Lord Henry de Audley and Bertrade Mainwaring, members of the House of Stanley. His brother-in-law, Sir James Audley, was Chief governor of Ireland from Dublin Castle, and a companion of Richard of Cornwall, King of the Romans.

His sister-in-law, Ela Longespée, was the daughter of crusader William Longespée the Younger, grandson of king Henry II of England. Longespée's brother, William, also married Maud de Clifford, granddaughter of the prince of North Wales, Llywelyn ab Iorwerth.

== Death and issue ==
He died in 1269 (or 1270) leaving issue:

- Madog II, succeeded his father and was killed in battle with the English in 1277.
- Llywelyn.
- Owain, whose daughter, Gweirca ferch Owain, has the oldest dated grave slab in Wales.
- Gruffudd Fychan I who died in 1289.
- Angharad d. 1308. m (after 1261) William le Boteler of Wem, Shropshire (d. 1283).
  One of their children was the 1st Baron William Boteler. His son, the 2nd Baron, married the daughter of Richard Fitzalan, 1st Earl of Arundel, while the 2nd Baron's great-grandson, Sir Robert Ferrers, married Countess Joan Beaufort, the daughter of Prince John of Gaunt, Duke of Lancaster.
- Margery ferch Gruffydd (b. 1261), married Sir John de Arderne.

Powys Fadog was divided, in accordance with Welsh custom, between his sons:

- Madog received Maelor.
- Gruffudd had Iâl (Yale) and Edeirnion, which included Glyndyfrdwy.
- Swydd y Waun (containing the commotes of Cynllaith and Nanheudwy) was divided between Llywelyn and Owain.
