= Madog ap Gruffudd Maelor (died 1277) =

Welsh prince, of Powys Fadog

Arms of Powys Fadog

Madog ap Gruffudd was a Prince of Powys Fadog from 1269 to 1277. He supported the Prince of Wales, Llywelyn ap Gruffudd, who had married the daughter of Simon de Montfort, 6th Earl of Leicester.

== Lineage and inheritance ==
He inherited the throne on the death of his father Gruffudd Maelor (died 1269), and was the Lord of the Castle of Dinas Bran.

== Alliance with Gwynedd ==
He was in alliance with Llywelyn ap Gruffudd, the prince of Gwynedd and all Wales as his effective overlord during the period following the Treaty of Montgomery.

== Death and burial ==
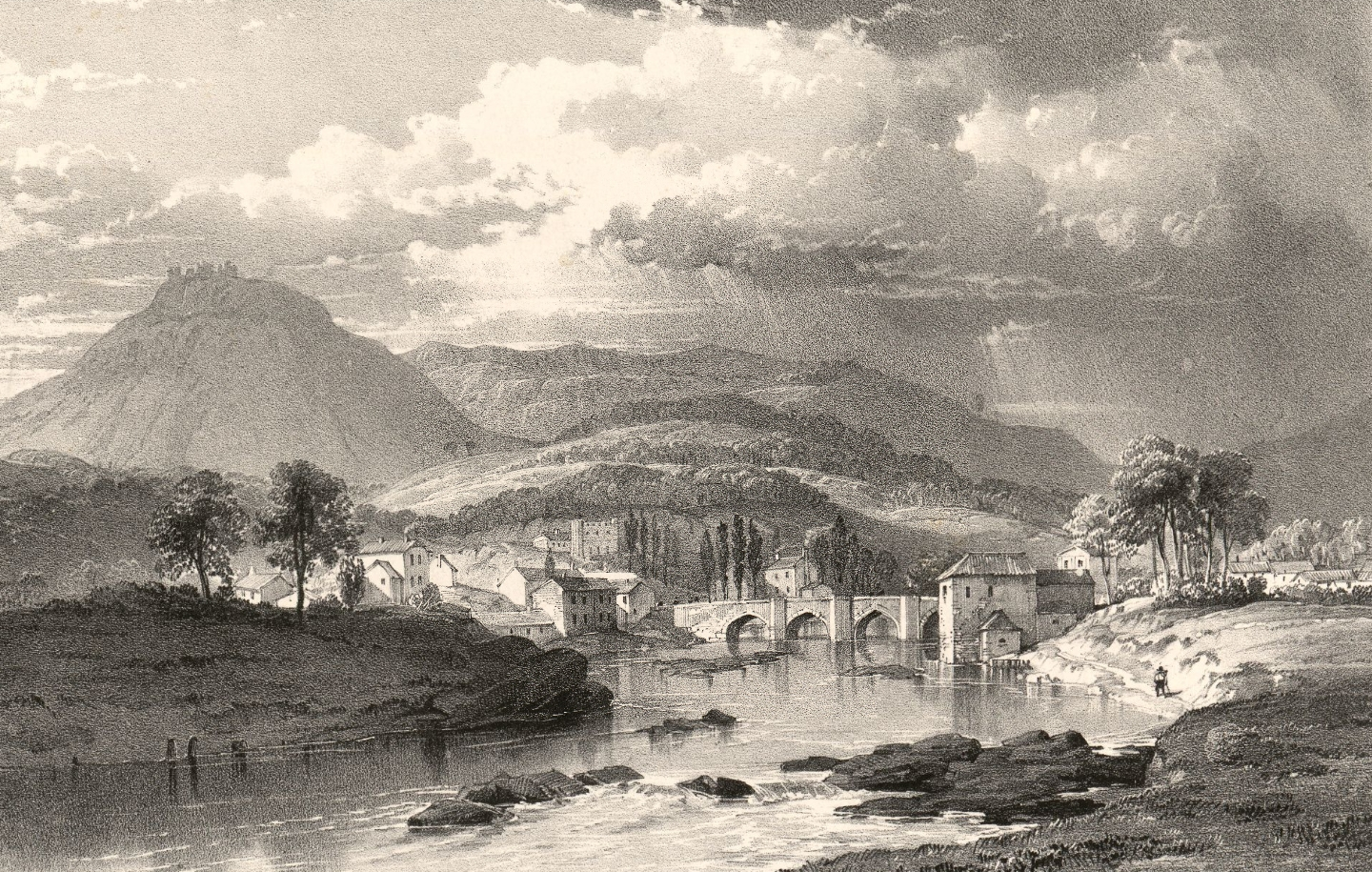
Castell Dinas Bran, near Valle Crucis Abbey, prince Madog was its patron

In 1275, Llywelyn married the daughter of Simon de Montfort, 6th Earl of Leicester, the arch-enemy of the English king's father, Henry III. Simon's wife was Eleanor of England, the daughter of King John of the House of Plantagenet.

When Llywelyn refused to offer a personal explanation, the king declared him a rebel and in 1277 invaded North Wales.

Although the king's primary target was Gwynedd, Powys Fadog stood in the way. Madog chose to support Llywelyn, and was consequently killed in the fighting. It is thought that Madog may have been buried at Valle Crucis Abbey, of which he was a patron.

Madog was succeeded by his younger brother Gruffydd. The conflict between Llywelyn and the King was settled by the Treaty of Aberconwy, which released Gruffydd and other Welsh princes from any allegiance to Llywelyn.

== Sources ==
- 'Littere Wallie'
- 'The History of Wales' Lloyd.
