= Gweirca ferch Owain =

Welsh noblewoman

Gweirca ferch Owain (possibly Gwerica) was a medieval Welsh noblewoman, granddaughter of Madog ap Gruffydd Maelor and daughter of Owain ap Gruffydd ap Madog.

== Death and burial ==
Gweirca died in 1290 and is buried at Valle Crucis Abbey, near Llangollen, which was founded by her grandfather.

Her sepulchral grave slab has been preserved at the Abbey and represents the earliest-dated grave slab in north Wales. The stone is badly weathered and exists only in fragments. However, the following details can be identified: "an inscription, placed within a border, surrounding a narrow band of decoration. This consists of the upper part of two animals with their heads back to back and their tails interlacing elaborately with two circles. The lower part of the panel has interlacing stems."

The inscription in Latin reads:

HIC IACET GWEIRCA FILIA OWENI ... PPICIETVR... AME...E ADO MCC LXXXX

Translated as:

Here lies Gweirca, daughter of Owain... (may God) have mercy... on her soul... AD 1290

Peter Lord states that Gweirca's grave slab is "the earliest-dated Welsh memorial of any kind".
