= Gruffudd ap Gwenwynwyn =

Prince of Powys Wenwynwyn

- Reign: 1241–1287
- Predecessor: Llywelyn ab Iorwerth
- Successor: Owen de la Pole
- Noble family: Lleision
- Spouse: Hawise Lestrange
- Issue: Owen de la Pole; Gwilym de la Pole; Gruffudd Fychan de la Pole; Margaret de la Pole; Llywelyn de la Pole
- Father: Gwenwynwyn
- Mother: Margaret Corbet

Arms of Powys

Gruffudd ap Gwenwynwyn (died c. 1286) was a Welsh king who was lord of the part of Powys known as Powys Wenwynwyn; he sided with King Edward I of England in the latter's conquest of Wales of 1277–1283.

Gruffudd was the son of Gwenwynwyn and Margaret Corbet. He was still a child when his father, who had been driven out of his princedom by Llywelyn ab Iorwerth (Llywelyn the Great), died in exile in 1216. He spent his youth in England, maintained by the King, and did not return to Wales until after Llywelyn's death. When Dafydd ap Llywelyn was forced to come to terms with King Henry III of England in 1241, Gruffudd was given most of the lands formerly held by his father, paying homage to Henry for them. Around this time he married Hawise, daughter of John Lestrange of Knockin, Shropshire.

When Llywelyn ap Gruffudd increased his power in Wales after 1255, Gruffudd continued to support the English Crown, and in 1257 he was again driven into exile. In 1263, he agreed to transfer his allegiance to Llywelyn under threat of being stripped of his lands, and this was confirmed at the Treaty of Montgomery in 1267. In 1274 Gruffudd, his wife Hawise and his son Owain were all involved with Llywelyn's brother Dafydd ap Gruffudd in a plot to assassinate Llywelyn. Dafydd was with Llywelyn at the time, and it was arranged that Owain would come with armed men on 2 February to carry out the assassination; however, he was prevented from doing so by a snowstorm. Llywelyn did not discover the full details of the plot until later that year, when Owain confessed to the Bishop of Bangor.

He said that the intention had been to make Dafydd Prince of Gwynedd, and that Dafydd would then reward Gruffudd with lands. When Llywelyn discovered the details of the plot he sent envoys to Welshpool to summon Gruffudd to appear before him, but Gruffudd fled to England. He settled in Shrewsbury and used it as a base for raids on Llywelyn's lands, probably encouraged by the English King. After the war of 1277, when Llywelyn was forced to cede his lands outside Gwynedd, Gruffudd was again given his lands back. He became embroiled in an increasingly bitter dispute with Llywelyn over lands in Arwystli. Llywelyn wanted the issue resolved by Welsh law while Gruffudd wanted English law to be used and was supported by King Edward I of England.

Gruffudd supported Edward I in the final war of 1282, although by now he was an old man. There have been suggestions that his eldest son Owain may have been involved in the killing of Llywelyn at Cilmeri in December that year.

At the end of the Welsh War of 1282–1283, the principality of Powys Wenwynwyn was abolished and the family – now Marcher Lords – adopted the surname de la Pole, meaning "of Poole", referring to their family seat in Poole (modern Welshpool). For his loyalty to Edward I, the king permitted Baron de la Pole to begin building (or re-building) Powis Castle. After 1283 his estate became increasingly controlled by his son Owain and he died some time between February 1286 and the end of 1287.

Owain divided the lands he inherited with his brothers, by arrangements later recorded in detail in the Calendar of Patent Rolls for 1342, pages 496–7.

He was buried in the Blackfriars Priory in Shrewsbury.

Regnal titles
Preceded by Llywelyn ab Iorwerth	Prince of Powys Wenwynwyn; 1241–1287	Succeeded by Owen de la Pole
