= Peredur Lynch =

Welsh academic

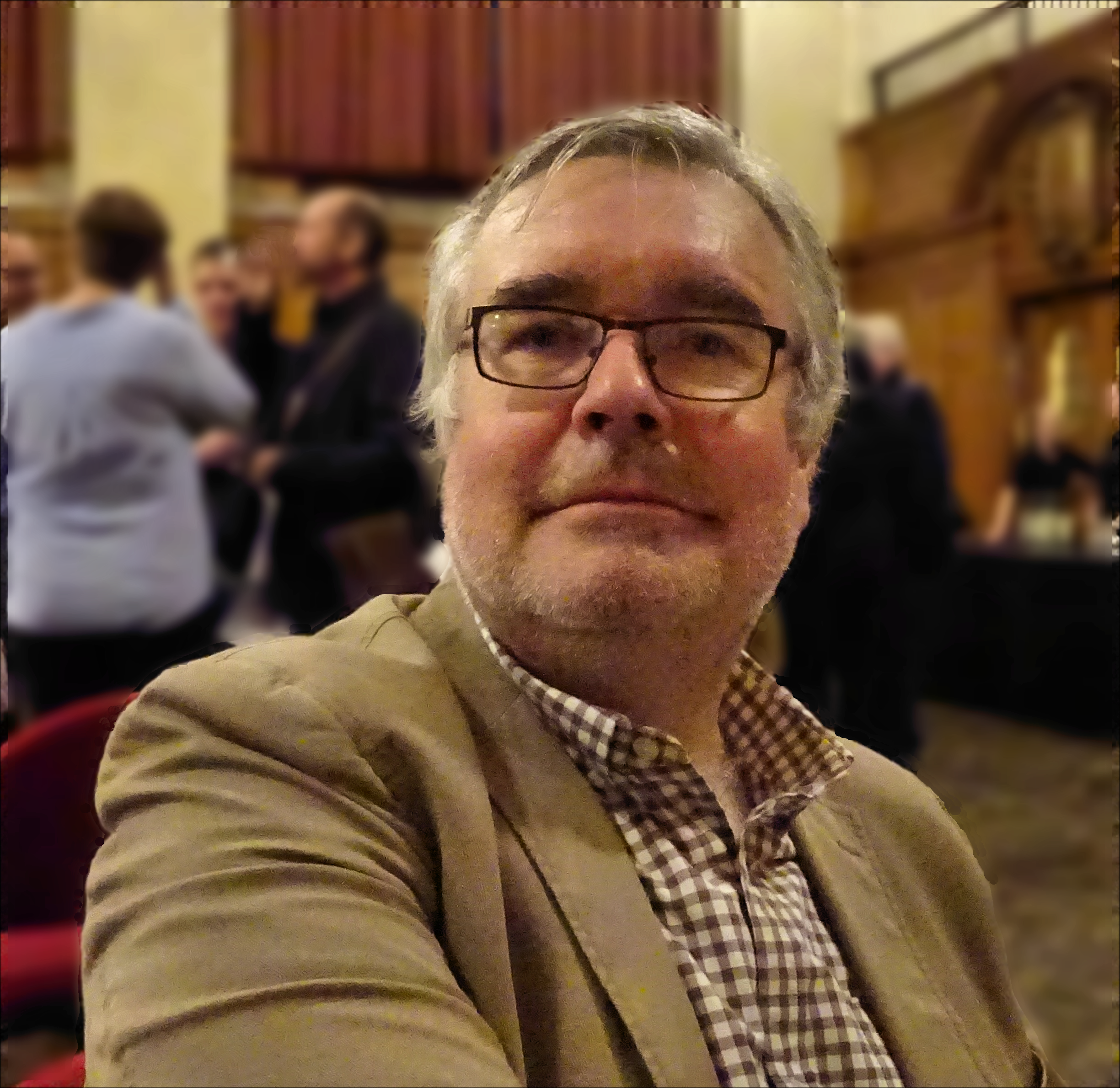
- Lynch in 2018
- Born: Peredur Ionor Lynch; 13 January 1963 (age 63); Wrexham, Wales
- Occupations: Poet; Lecturer
- Children: 2

Peredur Ionor Lynch, FLSW (born 13 January 1963) is a Welsh academic who serves as professor of Welsh & Medieval Literature in the School of Welsh and Celtic Studies at Bangor University.

== Early life and education ==
Lynch spent much of his early life in Carrog in northern Wales and obtained a degree at Bangor University. He has won a number of Eisteddfod Chairs, beginning with the Urdd National Eisteddfod Chair at Maesteg in 1979. His awdl was received so well that in 1980 he was lauded as "one of the great potentials of Welsh poetry".

== Career and research ==
Lynch, however, became best known for his academic career and his scholarly work on Welsh literary history. In 1985, he became a Research Fellow at the University of Wales Centre for Advanced Welsh and Celtic Studies in Aberystwyth (1985–1990), moved to Swansea to become lecturer in Welsh and in 1995 returned to his alma mater (Bangor), where he was also appointed as lecturer in Welsh. In 2003 he became head of the Welsh Department at Bangor (2003–2006), and in 2005 was appointed to a professor's chair.

His scholarly contributions have focused on medieval and early modern Welsh poetry, notably that of the Gogynfeirdd or Poets of the Princes. He assisted J. E. Caerwyn Williams in preparing an edition of Gogynfeirdd poetry, the first to be published for Cyfres Beirdd y Tywysogion ('The Poets of the Princes series'), and made further contributions to the series. On the topic of prophecy in Welsh poetry, he has both led a research project (2002–2005) and read a paper in the 2004 J. E. Caerwyn and Gwen Williams Memorial Lecture. He is one of the editors of the Welsh Academy Encyclopaedia of Wales.

In 2001, Lynch published Cywion Nell, a Welsh adaptation of Robert Barnard's 1981 novel Mother's Boys.

In 2016, Lynch was elected as a Fellow of the Learned Society of Wales.

== Selected works ==
Academic

- 1994. Ed., with J.E. Caerwyn Williams. Gwaith Meilyr Brydydd a'i Ddisgynyddion. Cyfres Beirdd y Tywysogion I. Cardiff: University of Wales Press.
- 2000. "Court Poetry, Power and Politics". In The Welsh King and his Court, ed. T.M. Charles–Edwards, et al. Cardiff: University of Wales Press. pp. 167–90.
- 2007. Proffwydoliaeth a'r Syniad o Genedl. Bangor: University of Wales, Bangor. ISBN 978-1-84220-103-9
- 2008. Ed. with John Davies, Nigel Jenkins and Menna Baines. The Welsh Academy Encyclopaedia of Wales. Cardiff: University of Wales Press. ISBN 978-0-7083-1953-6.

Other

- 2001. Cywion Nell. ISBN 978-0-948469-71-8.
- 2017. Caeth a Rhydd. ISBN 978-1-845275-30-3
