= Roger le Strange, Baron Strange =

Anglo-Norman knight and official

Coat of arms of Roger le Strange, Baron Strange, Gules, two lions passant argent; a bordure indented or..

Roger le Strange, Baron Strange, also known as Roger Lestrange or Roger Strange (died 31 July 1311), Lord of Ellesmere, was an English knight, commander and royal advisor.

== Life ==
=== Role in Wales ===
The second son of John Lestrange and his wife Lucy, daughter of Robert of Tregoz, he was given land taken by Henry III of England from rebels in the Second Barons' War. From May 1270 to October 1274 he was Sheriff of Yorkshire, but the focus of his activities was in Cheshire, Shropshire and Staffordshire. Due to his local knowledge of the Welsh Marches he was an important advisor to Edward I of England during his conquest of Wales. During Edward's first campaign in 1277 he was put in charge of Oswestry Castle, Dinas Bran, Builth and Montgomery Castle - the Welsh inhabitants living near these castles regarded him as a tyrant.

Roger played a major part in the 1282-83 campaign and on 30 October 1282 succeeded Roger Mortimer, 1st Baron Mortimer as the English commander in mid-Wales. On 11 December, he fought at the battle of Orewin Bridge, in which Llywelyn ap Gruffydd was killed - Lestrange wrote the letter informing Edward of his death. From 1283, he took part in the siege and capture of Castell y Bere.

In 1284, he took part in Edward's castle-building campaign in north Wales. In 1287, he took part in the suppression of Rhys ap Maredudd's revolt and the siege of Dryslwyn Castle, as well as the suppression of the 1294 Welsh uprising under Madog ap Llywelyn and the 1295 Gascon and 1297 Flanders campaigns of the Gascon War.

On 21 October 1283, he was transferred to the role of justiciar of the "Forest south of the Trent", which he held until 12 February 1297.

=== Marriages ===
Roger's first marriage was to Maud, widow of Roger II de Mowbray, 6th Baron Mowbray (died 1266), younger brother of William de Mowbray, signatory of Magna Carta. After her death, he was allowed to hold her lands and property until her children came of age in 1278. On the death of his brother, Hamo le Strange, without issue in 1272 or 1273 Roger inherited Ellesmere, Shropshire and other lands. His second wife Eleanor died in 1280 and in 1307 he married his third wife, another Maud.

=== Later life ===
In 1291 he was sent as an envoy to pope Nicolas IV, only returning in 1292. He was summoned to several meetings of parliament and the royal counsel and in 1295 he was given the title Baron Strange. Despite his contribution to the conquest of Wales, he did not have a fiefdom or lordship there, although he had hoped to rule Maelor Saesneg in north Wales.

He served in the royal household as a knight for many years but he was already recorded as being sick in 1298 - Edward decreed in 1306 that he was so indebted to him for his service that he would attend his funeral. He undertook several further smaller missions for the king and was one of the signatories of the barons' letter to the pope in 1301. He died without surviving issue in 1311 after a long illness.
