= Studia Celtica =

- Discipline: Celtic Studies
- Language: English
- Edited by: Ann Parry Owen

Publication details
- Former name(s): Bulletin of the Board of Celtic Studies
- History: 1922 to present
- Publisher: University of Wales Press on behalf of the University of Wales Board of Celtic Studies (Wales, United Kingdom)
- Frequency: Annual

Standard abbreviations
- ISO 4: Stud. Celt.

Indexing
- ISSN: 0081-6353 (print); 2058-5098 (web)

Links
- Journal homepage; Studia Celtica at IngentaConnect

Studia Celtica is an annual journal published in Wales containing scholarly articles on linguistic topics, mainly in English but with some Welsh and German; it also contains book reviews and obituaries. The journal is published by the University of Wales Press on behalf of the University of Wales Board of Celtic Studies. Since 1993 it has also covered literary, historical, and archaeological topics pertaining to Celtic studies. From 1922 to 1992 it was published under the title Bulletin of the Board of Celtic Studies (Welsh: Bwletin Y Bwrdd Gwybodau Celtaidd). "The journal was an immediate success, attracting contributions from some of the leading specialists."

Later issues are available electronically from the IngentaConnect subscription service.
