= Rhirid Flaidd =

Twelfth-century Welsh noble

Rhirid Flaidd ap Gwrgenau
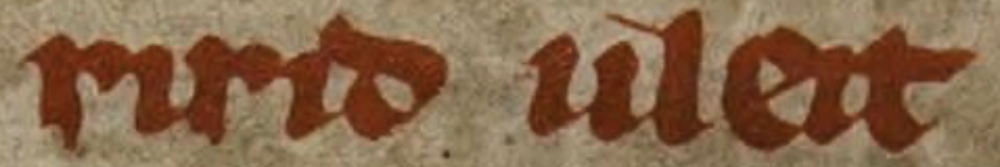
- Rhirid Flaidd's name in the rubrication of a poem to him in the Hendregadredd Manuscript
- Spouse: Gwenllïan ferch Ednyfed
- Father: Gwrgenau ap Gollwyn
- Mother: Haer ferch Cynfyn Hirdref

Rhirid Flaidd ap Gwrgenau (fl. 1160) was the son of Gwrgenau, who is supported by an obscure pedigree going back to Cunedda Wledig, the progenitor of the House of Cunedda which had provided the kings of Gwynedd from the end of Roman Britain until 825.

Rhirid, who is said to have inherited his father's lands in Mochnant and Penllyn, Pennant Melangell and Rhiwaedog as well as the maternal inheritance at Gest. He is said to have married Gwenllian, daughter of Ednyfed ap Cynwrig, by whom he had two sons, Einion and Madog.
