= Gruffudd Fychan (died 1289) =

Welsh noble (died 1289)

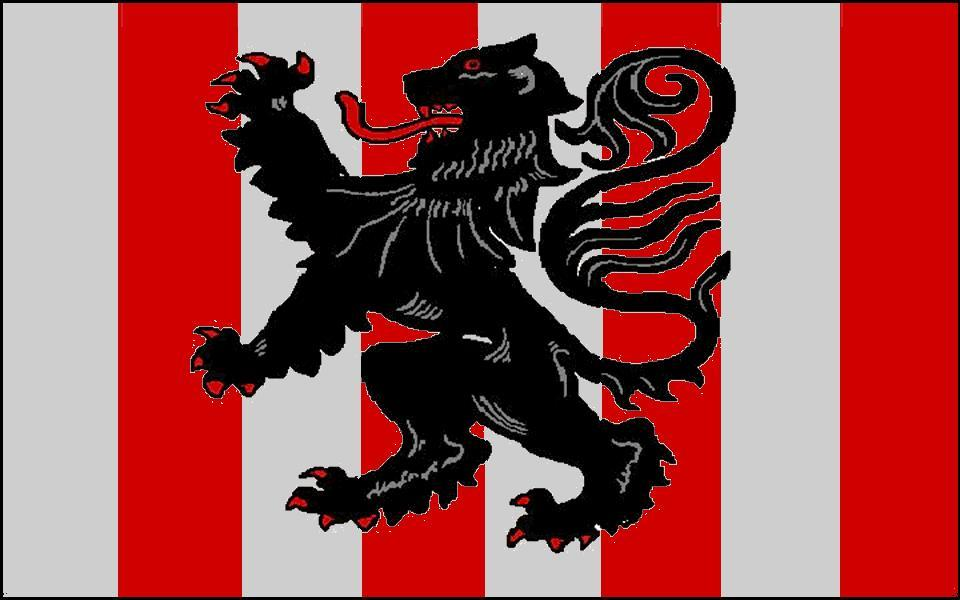
Banner of the Arms of Gruffudd

Gruffudd Fychan was a member of the Lleision.

== Biography ==
Gruffudd Fychan was the youngest of the four sons of Prince Gruffudd ap Madog and great-grandson of Gruffudd Maelor, Prince of Powys Fadog with Angharad, daughter of King Owain Gwynedd. On his father's death in 1269 (or 1270) his share of inheritance was the Lordship of Iâl and Edeirnion, which included Glyn Dyfrdwy.

He was aligned to Llywelyn ap Gruffudd, Prince of Wales, against the Anglo-Normans in the Conquest of Wales by Edward I in 1277.

In the Statute of Rhuddlan peace treaty, it was agreed that Gruffudd would not do homage to Llywelyn for Edeirnion, but to Edward Longshanks to keep the commote of Iâl. He again fought alongside Llywelyn during the War of 1282–1283, and lost his lands to the English following his defeat. Gruffudd's brother, Owain ap Madog, also lost his part of the lordship, not to Edward I, but to Queen Eleanor of Castille.

Nevertheless, the new Lord of Bromfield and Yale, the Earl of Surrey persuaded the king to allow him possession of his lands, which he held from the king as a tenant at will for the rest of his life.

In 1283, he obtained from the king the land of Glyndyfrdwy, anglicised as Glendower, and also owned the village of Corwen and the manor of Hafod Cil y Maen Llwyd. In 1284, he recognised a debt of eleven marks to Robert Burnell, the Lord Chancellor of England.

He died in 1289 leaving a young son, Madog Crypl, who was put in the wardship of John de Warenne, 6th Earl of Surrey, who later started the construction of Holt Castle in the lordship, and commanded the Battle of Stirling Bridge against Sir William Wallace during the English invasion of Scotland during the First War of Scottish Independence.
