= Listed buildings in Farndon, Cheshire =

Farndon is a civil parish in Cheshire West and Chester, England. It contains 19 buildings that are recorded in the National Heritage List for England as designated listed buildings. One of these is listed at Grade I, the highest grade, three at the middle grade, Grade II*, and the rest at the lowest grade, Grade II. Apart from the village of Farndon, the parish is rural. The listed buildings include houses in the village, the church and tombs in the churchyard, the ancient bridge crossing the River Dee, the former village lock-up, and a memorial.

== Key ==
Grade	Criteria
I	Buildings of exceptional interest, sometimes considered to be internationally important
II*	Particularly important buildings of more than special interest
II	Buildings of national importance and special interest

== Buildings ==
Name and location	Photograph	Date	Notes	Grade
Farndon Bridge; 53.08365°N 2.87972°W		1339	The road bridge crosses the River Dee between the villages of Farndon and Holt, and is partly in Wales. It is constructed in sandstone, and consists of eight arches, five of which are cross the river. The bridge is also a scheduled monument.	I
St Chad's Church; 53.0840°N 2.8774°W		14th century	The oldest fabric in the church is in the lower part of the tower. The church was badly damaged in the Civil War, following which it was largely rebuilt in 1658. It was restored in the 19th century. The church is constructed in sandstone with slate roofs, and consists of a nave, a chancel, a north porch, a south vestry, and a west tower.	II*
The Chimes; 53.08460°N 2.87863°W		17th century	A timber-framed cottage with brick nogging and a slate roof. It is in 1½ storeys, and has casement windows and two gabled dormers.	II
Tudor; 53.08467°N 2.87875°W		17th century	A timber-framed cottage with brick nogging. It is in 1½ storeys, and has casement windows. On the front are three gabled dormers.	II
Chapel House; 53.08509°N 2.87748°W		Mid-17th century	A former chapel and house, later converted into a house, built in brick on a sandstone plinth, with a slate roof. It has two storeys and an attic, with a shaped gable facing the road. It has a stone doorway with a semi-circular head. Between the ground and first floor is a brick dentil band. There is a small round window in the gable.	II
Top Farm; 53.0849°N 2.8757°W		Mid-17th century	The former farmhouse is in brick on a stone plinth with slate roofs. It consists of a central block with two cross wings. The central block and the right wing has two storeys; the left wing has three storeys and shaped gable s on the front and the back. The windows are a mix of sashes and casements. Inside is an inglenook.	II
Holly Bank; 53.0838°N 2.8751°W		Late 17th century	A brick house with stone dressings and a slate roof. It is symmetrical, and in three storeys. The windows are sashes. Inside the house is an inglenook and oak panelling.	II*
Black and White Cottages; 53.08424°N 2.87504°W		Late 17th century (probable)	A row of three timber-framed cottages with brick nogging and thatched roofs. They are in one storey with an attic, and each cottage has a gabled eyebrow dormer. All the windows are casements. Parts of the timber-framing have been replaced with brick.	II
Table tombs, St Chad's Churchyard; 53.08445°N 2.87729°W		Early 18th century	A pair of adjacent table tombs in yellow sandstone. The inscriptions are weathered, and the carvings include an hourglass and a skull and crossbones.	II
Academy House; 53.08513°N 2.87718°W		Late 18th century	The house contains features from an earlier date, and at one time housed a school. It is built in brick with a slate roof, and has rusticated quoins. It has three storeys, and is in three bays, the central bay projecting slightly. The windows are sashes. Inside the house is an inglenook.	II
Holly Bush Cottage; 53.09165°N 2.87648°W		c. 1820	A sandstone cottage with a slate roof in Tudor Revival style. It consists of a main wing and a cross wing, and is in 1½ storeys. The cottage has casement windows, and a Tudor-arched doorway. The gables are coped with stone finials. The rear of the cottage is pebbledashed.	II
Church View; 53.08536°N 2.87732°W		Early 19th century	A brick house with a slate roof, forming part of a row. It has three storeys, each storey having sash windows with stone wedge lintels. The chimney is on the gable.	II
Holly Cottage; 53.08328°N 2.87272°W	—	Early 19th century	A brick house with a slate roof. It is almost symmetrical, with two storeys, and four windows in each storey. The inner windows are sashes, and the outer windows are replaced casements, all under painted stone wedge lintels and with cills. In the left gable wall is a 20th-century oriel window.	II
Laurel Bank; 53.0849°N 2.8783°W		Mid-18th century	A brick house with a slate roof and rusticated quoins. It is asymmetrical, with three storeys, and three windows in each storey. A two-storey wing to the left has an entrance for carts and a winch arm at the rear; internally there is a rock-cut cellar.	II
Poplar House; 53.08530°N 2.87677°W		Early 19th century	A brick house with a slate roof, attached to a cartshed and a stable. The house is in two storeys, and has an open gabled porch. The windows are sashes under rusticated keystone lintels. The former cartshed and stable are attached to the right side of the house and contain an arched entrance, above which is a door to the hayloft.	II
Sunnyside; 53.08536°N 2.87721°W		Early 19th century	A brick house with a slate roof on a plaster cornice. It has three storeys, and is in 1½ bays. One of the windows in the top floor, and the window by the door, are casements; the other windows are sashes with stone wedge lintels with cills.	II
Deebanks; 53.0846°N 2.8802°W		1830s (probable)	A pebbledashed house with a hipped slate roof, later divided into two houses. The main block has a symmetrical front, with a Doric doorway, above which is a bow window. To each side of the doorway is a single-storey canted bay window; the other windows are sashes. In the left wing the windows are in Gothick style.	II
Village lock-up 53.08469°N 2.87592°W		1837	The village lock-up is constructed in brick and has a pyramidal slate roof. There are two barred semi-circular openings with stone surrounds. The original doorway has been replaced. Between the openings is an inscription, including the date.	II
Barnston Memorial; 53.09054°N 2.87705°W		1858	The memorial, designed by E. A. Heffer, is to the memory of Major Barnston, who was killed in the Crimean War. It consists of a slim yellow sandstone obelisk, surrounded by cast iron railings. It is flanked by four crouching lions, and carries a plaque inscribed with details of his service and death.	II*
War memorial 53.08448°N 2.87741°W		1919	The war memorial is in limestone and consists of a Celtic-style wheel-head cross about 5 metres (16 ft) high. It has a tapering chamfered shaft on a rectangular plinth itself on a three-stepped chamfered base. The head is decorated with interlace detailing in relief. On the base is an inscription, and the names of those lost in both World Wars are inscribed on the plinth.	II

== See also ==
- Listed buildings in Barton
- Listed buildings in Churton by Aldford
- Listed buildings in Churton by Farndon
- Listed buildings in Coddington
- Listed buildings in Shocklach Oviatt
- Listed buildings in Stretton
