= Crewe Hill =

Coordinates: 53.06849°N 2.86597°W

Crewe Hill is a country house near Crewe by Farndon, to the southeast of the village of Farndon, Cheshire, England. It was enlarged from a farmhouse for the Barnston family of Churton Hall in the early 19th century. In about 1890 it was extended, including the addition of a dining room to the rear. The building is rendered, and has slate roofs. It is in two storeys, and is symmetrical, with a central gable and wings with gables. A cottage is attached to its right. Internally there is a central Great Hall rising through both storeys. This has a gallery and contains a collection of items of antiquarianism. The house and the attached cottage are recorded in the National Heritage List for England as a designated Grade listed building.
