= Farndon, Cheshire =

Village in Cheshire, England

Coordinates: 53.085°N 2.878°W

Farndon: Welsh: Rhedynfre
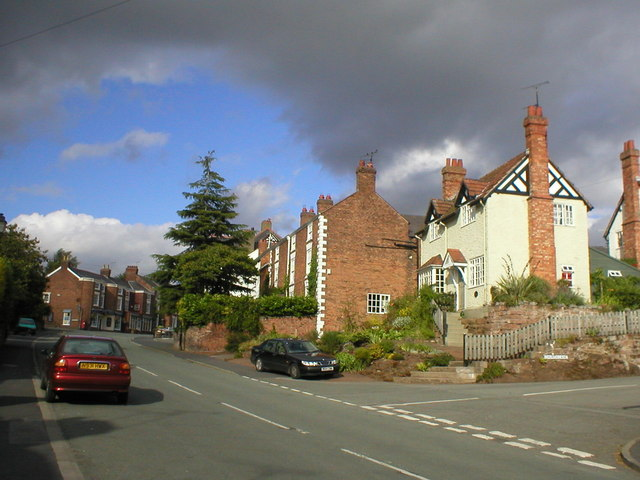

- Location within Cheshire
- Population: 1,653 (2011 census)
- OS grid reference: SJ412545
- Civil parish: Farndon
- Unitary authority: Cheshire West and Chester
- Ceremonial county: Cheshire
- Region: North West
- Country: England
- Sovereign state: United Kingdom
- Post town: CHESTER
- Postcode district: CH3
- Dialling code: 01829
- Police: Cheshire
- Fire: Cheshire
- Ambulance: North West
- UK Parliament: Chester South and Eddisbury

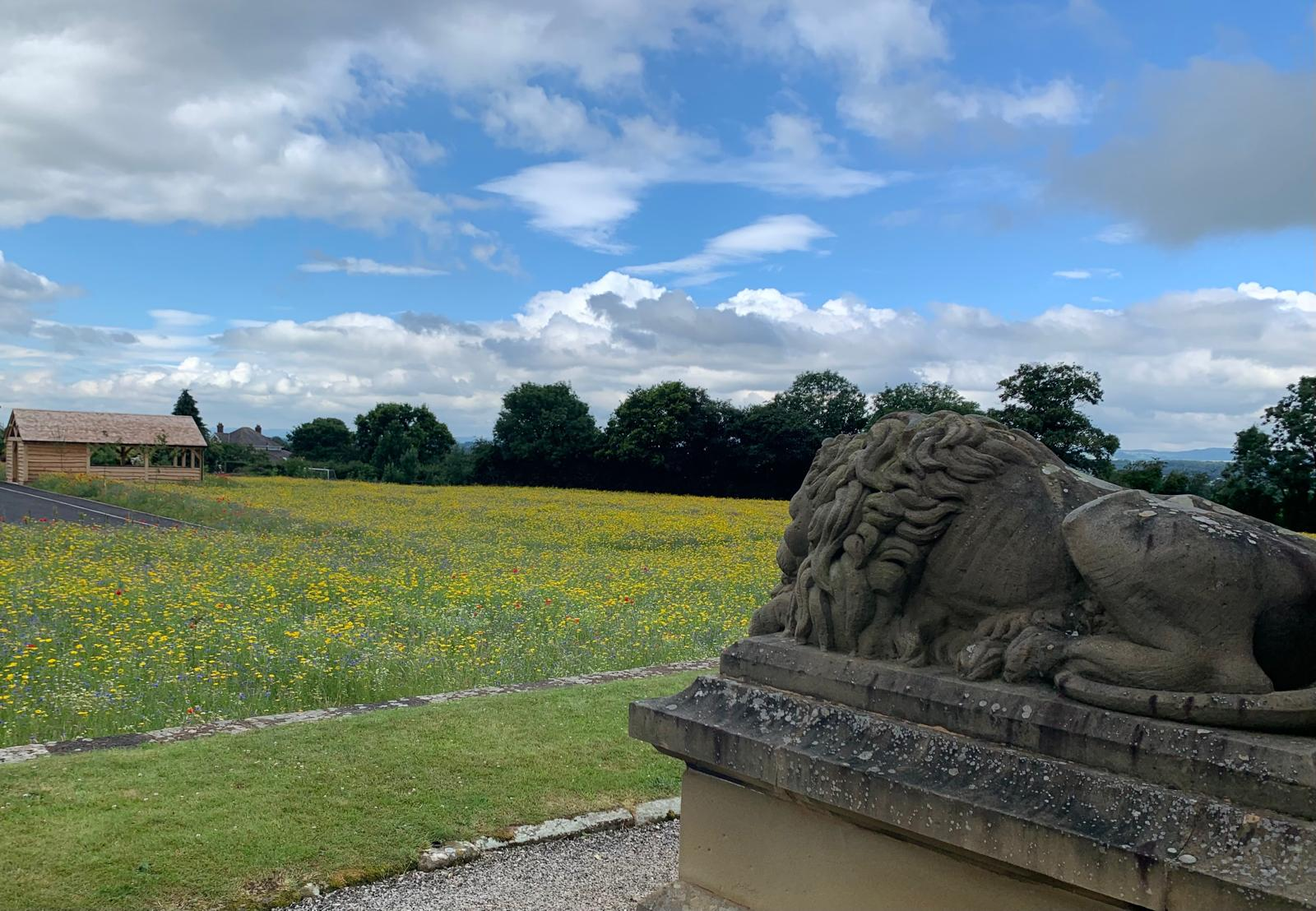
Monument Meadow Burial Ground in Farndon

Farndon is a village and civil parish in the unitary authority of Cheshire West and Chester and the ceremonial county of Cheshire, England. It is on the banks of the River Dee, which here forms the England–Wales border. The Welsh village of Holt lies just over the River Dee from Farndon, on the other side of the medieval Farndon Bridge. Farndon is 8 miles (13 km) south of the cathedral city of Chester.

In the 2001 census, the village had a population of 1,517, increasing to 1,653 by the 2011 census. This has further increased to 2,228 by the 2021 census.

== Toponymy ==
The village's English name was first recorded in Old English in 924 AD. It has been recorded as Fearndune, Farndune, Pharndoon, Ferentone, Ferendon, Faryngdon and Ferneton. The name means "Fern Hill".

As Farndon is adjacent to the England–Wales border (Farndon Bridge across the River Dee separates the village from Holt, Wrexham), it is also known as Rhedynfre in Welsh. Its dual name reflects the area's historical importance as a place of conflict and cultural exchange since the Angles settled the area in the 8th century. As the political border moved back and forth during the following centuries, Farndon has been either part of Wales or England several times.

== History ==
The area was inhabited during the Roman occupation of Britain. Archaeological assessments in the village have concluded there was a Roman villa in the area or even a small military outpost.

Edward the Elder, King of the Anglo-Saxons, died in the ancient parish of Farndon in 924, shortly after quelling a revolt of an alliance of Mercians and Welshmen. This involved Edward successfully taking Chester from the occupying Mercians and Welshmen, and then re-garrisoning it, and this happened shortly before his death. Up to the 14th century, Farndon also included the chapelry of Holt in Denbighshire, Wales.

Referenced in the Domesday Book as Ferentone, the settlement consisted of 34 households. Ownership was divided between the Bishop of Chester (Robert de Limesey) and Bigot de Loges (from Les Loges in France).

Some historians believe that Farndon was the location of the first ever competitive horse race with riders, in a local field on the banks of the River Dee. Nearby Chester Racecourse is said to be the oldest racecourse in Britain.

During the English Civil War, Farndon was the scene of bitter fighting over the bridge that was controlling access to Chester from Wales. There is a fine memorial window in the parish church to the Civil War Royalists. The village suffered damage during this period. The Church of St Chad, a grade II* listed building, was largely rebuilt during the 17th century and restored in the 19th century.

The village was at one time renowned for its strawberries, which were grown in the surrounding fields. The nearest fields are now in Holt.

The Barnston Estate provides housing and indirect employment for a number of people in the Farndon area. The Estate is managed by Edward Barnston.

== Governance ==
Farndon's local governance is provided by a parish council which maintains facilities and hosts events within the village. The local Farndon Community Club also provides social and sport activities, and promotes local events such as bonfire nights and themed quiz nights.

There is an electoral ward that has the same name. This ward stretches from Saighton in the north to Church Shocklach in the south. The total population of this ward at the 2011 census was 4,011.

== Community ==
The local community has hosted a soapbox derby charity event for the last four years, starting the idea during COVID-19 lockdown. The event so far has raised £167,500 for the Hospice of the Good Shepherd, a charity located in Chester which cares for people, and other local organisations such as the Farndon Memorial Hall, Holt community gardeners and local primary schools. Competitors enter handmade karts and outfits and race down the village hill in front of spectators.

== Heritage ==
In 2022, a ten-day archaeological dig took place on the Barnston Estate in Farndon. The Barnston Estate is one of Cheshire's oldest family estates, owning land around Farndon, Churton and Hapsford. The family's history dates back to the time of the Norman Conquest of 1066. Dozens of local volunteers were involved in the dig, ultimately digging up six trenches and using aerial photography and geophysical surveys to observe the findings.

The primary findings included evidence of a bloomery furnace suggesting the site was used to 'process iron ore into workable iron'. Other findings included Roman coins, ceramic spindle whorls, tile fragments, iron nails, and a worked flint. The site was thought to have been a Roman military fort linked to the tile and pottery works in the nearby medieval village, Holt.

== Landmarks ==
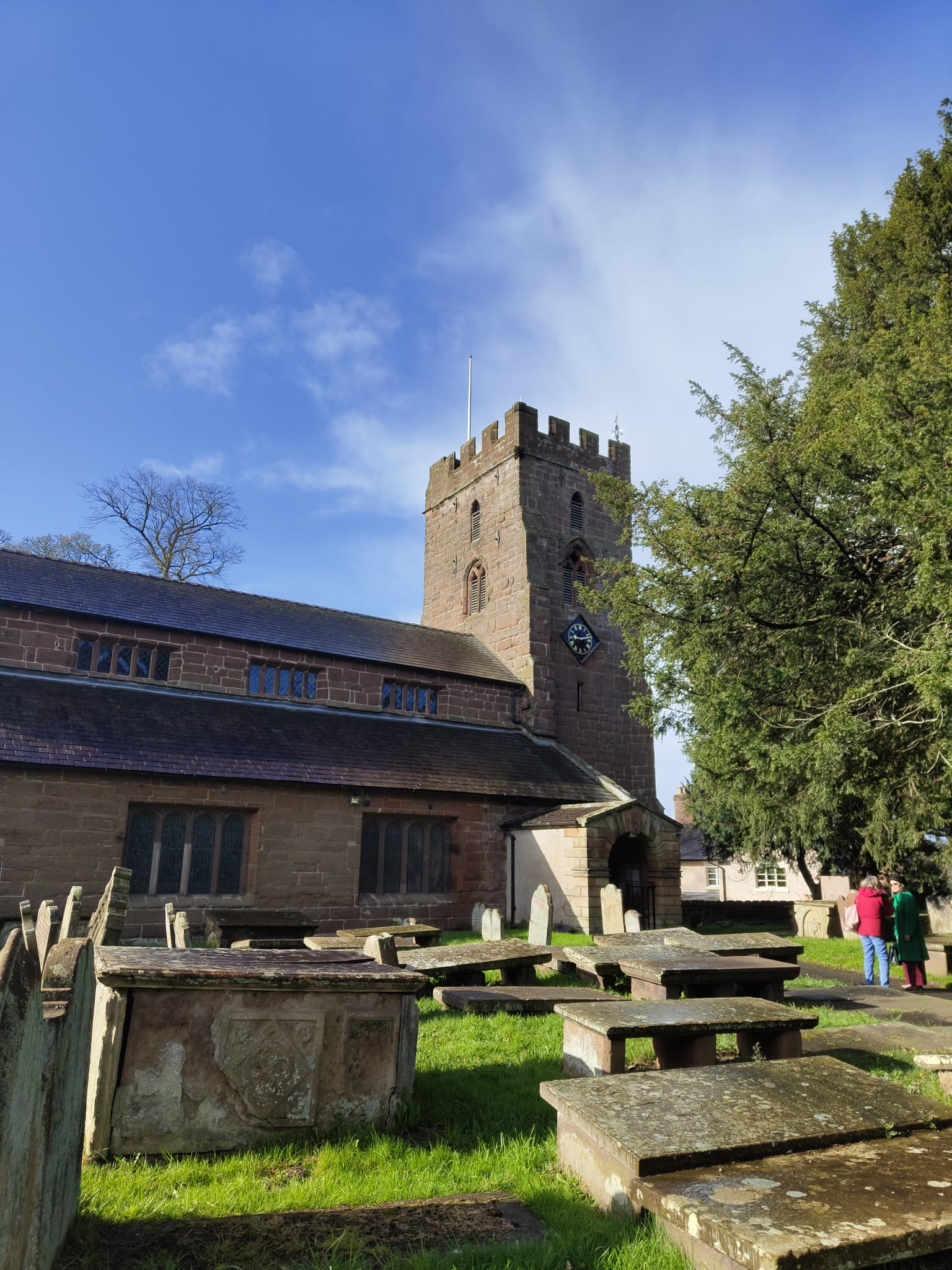
St Chad's Church

Farndon Bridge spans the River Dee connecting Farndon to the nearby Welsh village of Holt on higher ground. The 14th-century bridge is made of sandstone and is said to be haunted. Holt Castle is on the opposite side of the river; it was constructed in the 13th and 14th centuries. The castle fell to the forces of Oliver Cromwell in 1647.

Next to Farndon Bridge is a small picnic area beside the river. At the entrance to the picnic area are Farndon Cliffs. This area has been classed as a Site of Special Scientific Interest (SSSI). The sandstone cliffs contain exposed rock layers dating back to the Lower Triassic period.

St Chad's is the old parish church in Farndon. It is thought that some portions of the church date back to Sir Patrick de Bartun, a knight of King Edward III, whose effigy lies in the nave. The church was damaged during the English Civil War and later repaired. The church contains a unique Civil War memorial window, and features an image thought to be that of William Lawes, the famous court musician, who was slain at the battle of Rowton Heath. The church tower still shows signs of Civil War musket ball damage. The churchyard contains war graves of two British soldiers of World War I, Sergeant Joseph Easter and Private Thomas Harrison.

The village used to have four public houses: the Hare (formerly the Greyhound), the Nags Head, the Masons Arms and the Farndon Arms (formerly the Raven). Two of these, the Farndon Arms and the Nags Head, closed in the summer of 2007. Two public houses remain in Farndon, The Hare which opened in 2020 but was built in the 1900s, and The Raven which was refurbished in 2021 but built in the 16th century. The Nags Head was demolished to make way for a small retail development. The Masons Arms closed in 1928 and has been a private residence since that time. Farndon Community Club is a sports and social club on the outskirts of the village.

The village also has a Methodist Chapel at nearby Crewe by Farndon, a short walk from the village. Crewe was a civil parish in its own right until it was merged into Farndon in 2015.

The Barnston Memorial is a Grade II* listed obelisk and was built in memory of Roger Barnston Esq. in 1858, who died at the young age of 31. It states how Roger, who was a military officer, was injured at Lucknow during the Indian Mutiny and how he died at Cawnpore in India in 1857. The landmark has been in the village of Farndon for generations, and the Monument Meadow is a burial ground recognised for keeping with the natural environment.

== Education ==
Farndon is home to Farndon Primary School, providing education for children aged 3 to 11. The school plays a big role in the community, regularly hosting local events as well as activities. For secondary education, people tend to attend schools in nearby villages, towns, or the city of Chester.

== Notable residents ==
- Major Roger Barnston (1826–1857), served in the Crimean War and was killed in the Indian rebellion of 1857.
- Paul Burrell, former butler to Diana, Princess of Wales, maintained a home in the village and had a shop bearing his name, which he has since sold. It is now an antique shop called Botany House.
- Bob Mills, comedian and host of In Bed With Medinner and Win Lose or Draw, spent his childhood in the village and attended the old primary school.
- John Speed (1542–1629), cartographer, was born in Farndon.
- Matt Hancock attended Farndon County Primary School.
- Ricky Tomlinson has a holiday chalet on the banks for the River Dee, on the outskirts of Farndon.

== Gallery of images ==
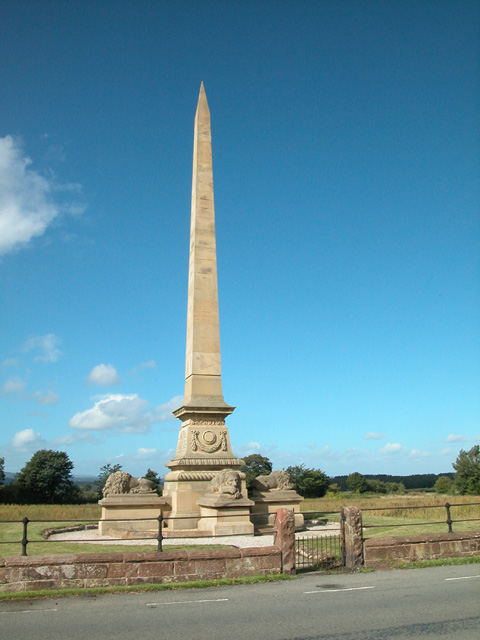
Barnston Monument

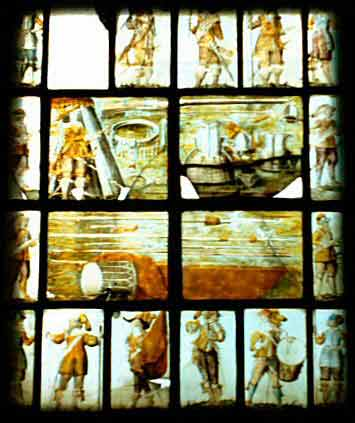
Farndon Civil War Memorial Window

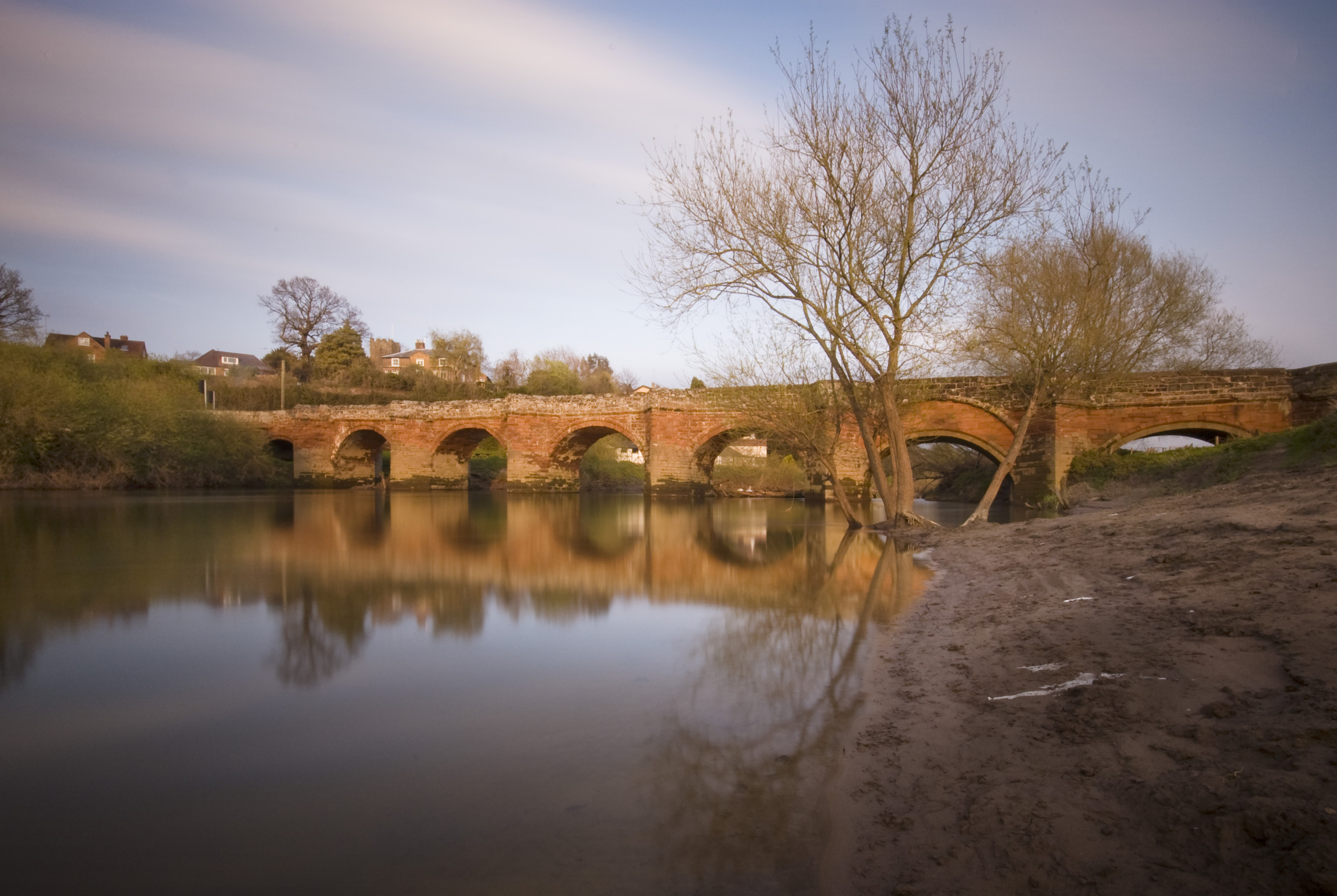
Farndon Bridge

== See also ==
- Listed buildings in Farndon, Cheshire

== Bibliography ==
- Bendall, Sarah (2004). "Speed, John (1551/2–1629)". Oxford Dictionary of National Biography. Oxford Dictionary of National Biography (online ed.). Oxford University Press. doi:10.1093/ref:odnb/26093. (Subscription, Wikipedia Library access or UK public library membership required.)
- Dodgson, J. McN. (1972). The place-names of Cheshire. Part four: The place-names of Broxton Hundred and Wirral Hundred. Cambridge: Cambridge University Press. ISBN 0-521-08247-1.
- Farndon Local History Group ed.Lathom, F. (1981). Farndon.
- www.farndon.org.uk Website of Farndon Local History Pages
- Royden, Mike, (2016). Village at War – The Cheshire Village of Farndon During the First World War, Reveille Press, ISBN 978-1908336699
