= Farndon Bridge =

Bridge between England and Wales

Farndon Bridge Pont Rhedynfre (Welsh)
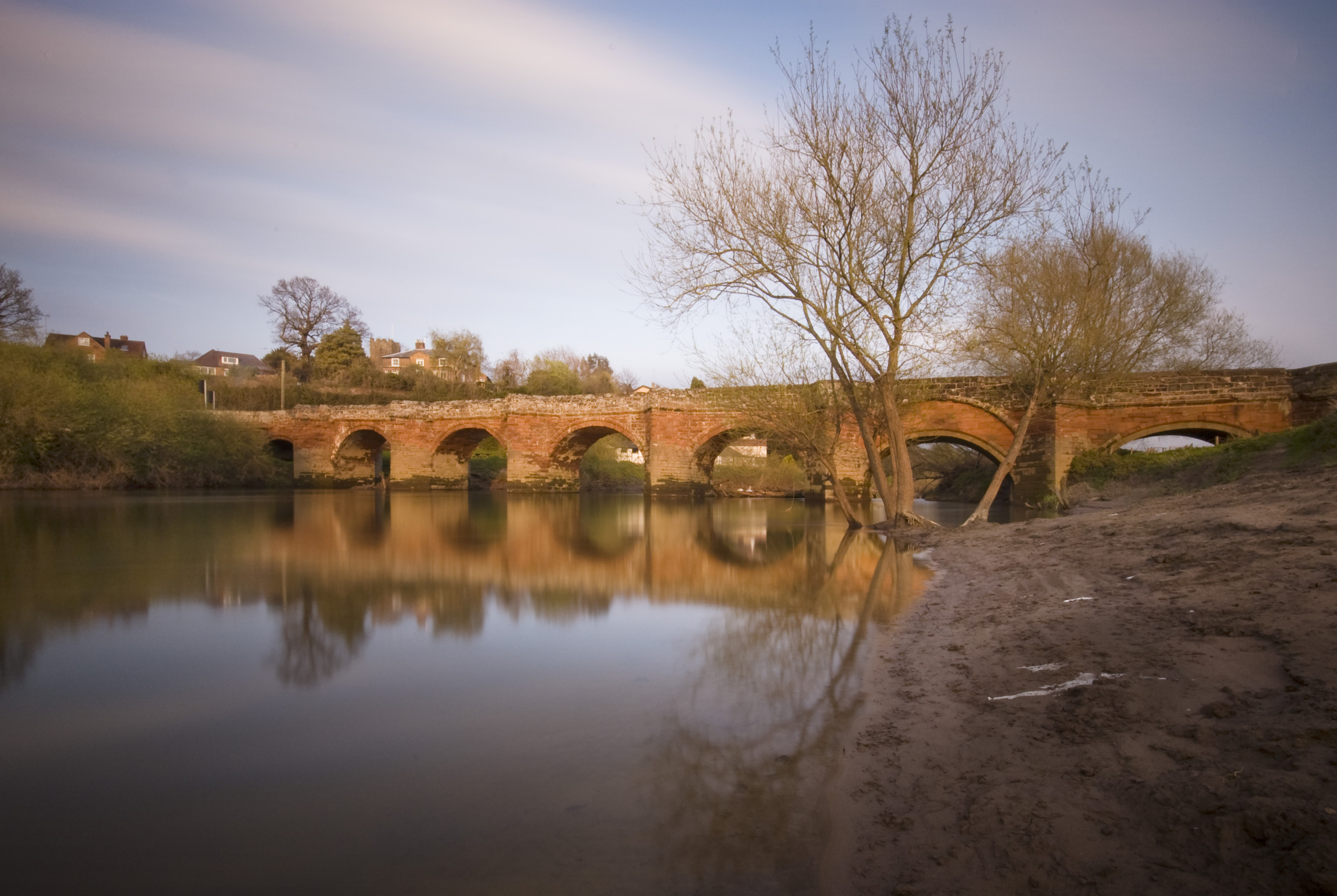
- Farndon Bridge
- Coordinates: 53.083373°N 2.879820°W
- Crosses: River Dee
- Locale: Farndon, Cheshire, England and Holt, Wrexham, Wales
- Other name(s): Holt Bridge; Pont Holt (Welsh)
- Heritage status: Grade I listed

Characteristics
- Design: Arch bridge

History
- Opened: 1339

Statistics
- Toll: None (Abolished 1866)

Location
- Interactive map of Farndon Bridge

Farndon Bridge, also known as Holt Bridge (Note: also known using both names such as Farndon/Holt or Holt–Farndon Bridge) (Welsh: Pont Rhedynfre or Pont Holt), crosses the River Dee and the England–Wales border between the villages of Farndon, Cheshire, England and Holt, Wrexham, Wales. The bridge, which was built in the mid-14th century, is recorded in the National Heritage List for England and by Cadw as a designated Grade I listed building and scheduled monument. It is built from locally quarried red sandstone and had eight arches, of which five are over the river. On the Farndon side there is one flood arch and two flood arches are on the Holt side.

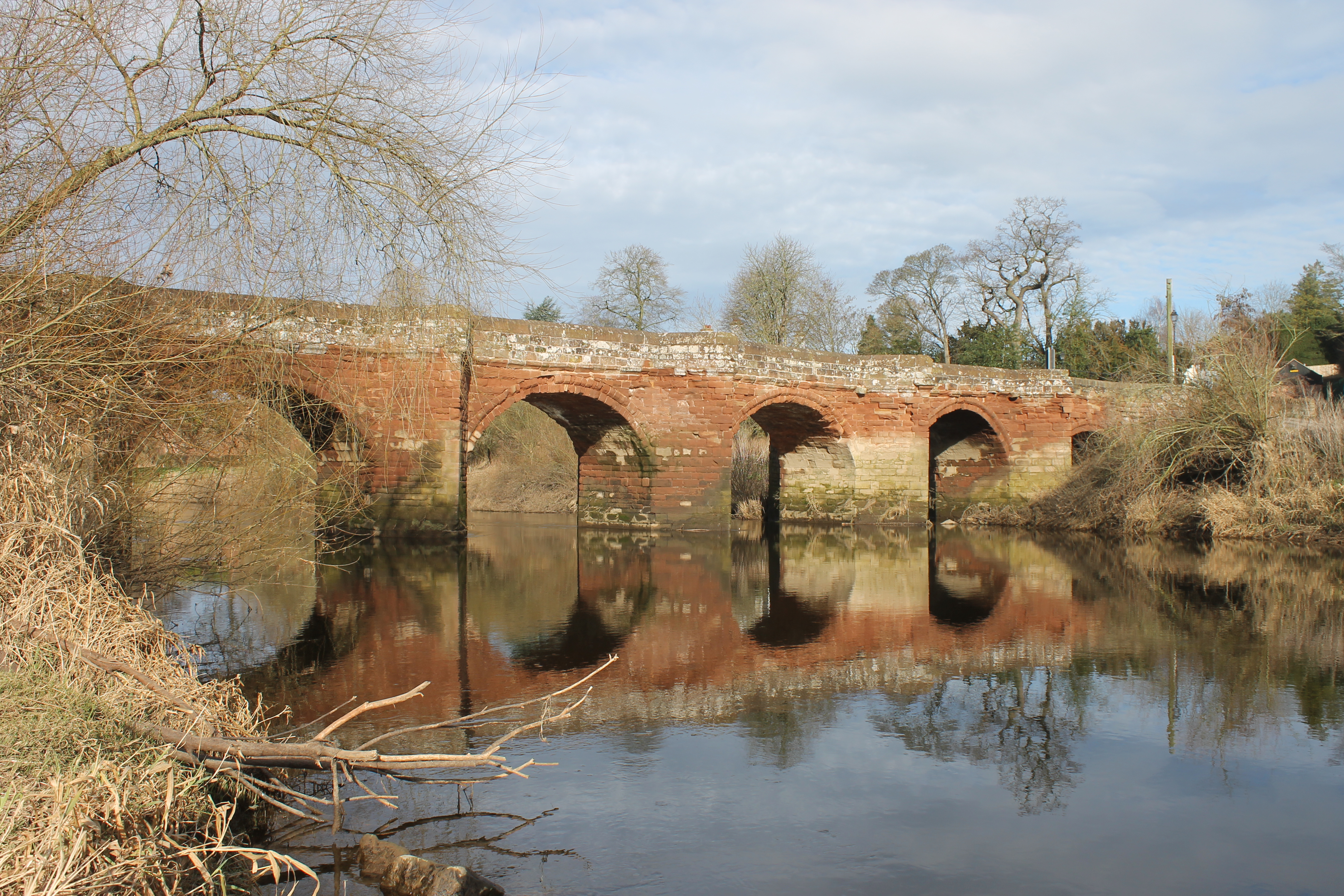
Farndon Bridge from the Welsh side

Documentary evidence states the bridge was built in 1339 by St Werburgh's Abbey in Chester. Originally it had ten arches, with a large gate tower on the fifth arch from the English side. The tower was demolished to road level in 1770 and at some time two of the arches on the Welsh side were lost. The area is reputedly haunted by two sons of a Welsh prince who were drowned in the river at this point by their English guardians, John de Warenne, 6th Earl of Surrey and Roger Mortimer de Chirk.

During the English Civil War, a brief skirmish occurred near the bridge in 1643 when Parliamentarian forces advanced towards the Royalists holding Holt on the western side of the river.

John Warwick Smith (26 July 1749 – 22 March 1831), a British watercolour landscape painter and illustrator, produced a painting of the bridge and the landscape around, which has been reproduced since for use on postcards.

The bridge was refurbished in 1870/1871 at a total cost of £1100. During the summer of 1870, two pillars were made safe as they had been reported as dangerous, and the lower rings of two arches were cut out and replaced with Minera stone cemented in place. Some work on the parapet walls was also required. Work was suspended during the winter and continued in 1871. The planned work included the removal of the toll-house and gate on the Denbighshire side, widening of the approach, and paving the road surface throughout. The final removal of the toll-house was delayed until 1879, when the bricks and other materials forming the toll house, and the gate posts and some adjoining land, were sold by auction with removal required within 14 days. At the time of the refurbishment there were some people who wanted the bridge replaced with a new one, but this was opposed by others such as the well respected builder George Clark, who wrote in defence of 'this beautiful structure' describing it as 'one of the few remaining links connecting the past with the present' dating back some 600 years. In June 1871 it was announced that the Farndon side of the bridge would receive similar improvements to those on the Holt side, i.e. widening the approach, paving, and making some repairs to the parapet walls.

Access is controlled by traffic lights, permitting road traffic to cross using the single-lane carriageway. Two narrow footpaths on either side of the road are provided for pedestrians. However, due to the bridge's age, it is closed intermittently for surveys to be conducted on its structure. In the early 1990s the bridge was restored and renovated and at the same time an archaeological survey was carried out. In the summer of 2018, the bridge was closed for significant structural repairs.

== See also ==
- Grade I listed buildings in Cheshire West and Chester
- Grade I listed buildings in Wrexham
- Listed buildings in Farndon, Cheshire
