= St Mary's Church, Coddington =

Coordinates: 53.0928°N 2.8182°W

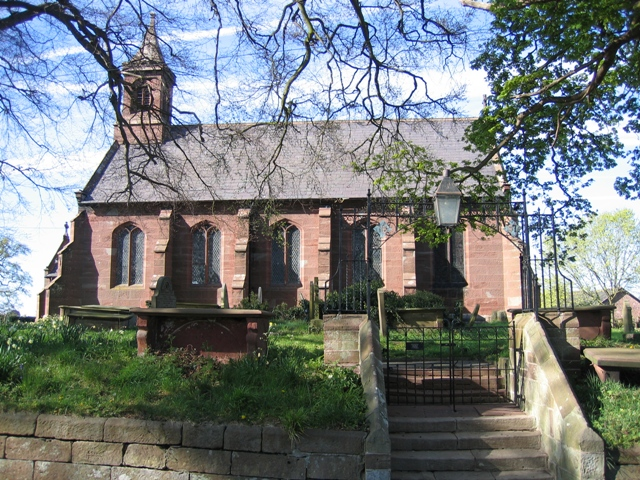
- St Mary's Church, Coddington, from the south

- Location in Cheshire
- OS grid reference: SJ 454 554
- Location: Coddington, Cheshire
- Country: England
- Denomination: Anglican
- Website: St Mary's, Coddington

History
- Status: Parish church
- Consecrated: 1834

Architecture
- Functional status: Active
- Heritage designation: Grade II
- Designated: 19 June 1984
- Architectural type: Church
- Completed: 1914
- Construction cost: £1314

Specifications
- Materials: Sandstone, grey slate roof

Administration
- Province: York
- Diocese: Chester
- Archdeaconry: Chester
- Deanery: Malpas
- Parish: Coddington, St Mary

Clergy
- Rector: Rev Captain David Scurr

St Mary's Church is in the civil parish of Coddington, Cheshire, England. The church is recorded in the National Heritage List for England as a designated Grade II listed building. It is an active Anglican parish church in the diocese of Chester, the archdeaconry of Chester and the deanery of Malpas. Its benefice is combined with that of St Chad's, Farndon.

== History ==
The parish of Coddington was created during the time of Honorius, Archbishop of Canterbury between 627 and 653. Following the Norman Conquest the parish was given to Hugh Lupus. The parish is recorded in the Domesday Book and in 1093 its patronage was in the possession of Hugh and Ralph de Arscio, the chamberlain and butler of Hugh Lupus. From 1098 the patronage was held by the Abbey of St Werburg at Chester, and after the dissolution of the monasteries it passed to Chester Cathedral jointly with the Duke of Westminster. The first church had been built between the 8th and 10th centuries in sandstone with a thatched roof and a central bell tower. This church became unsafe and was replaced by the present church in 1833. It was designed by John Atkinson. A west porch was added in 1914 as a memorial to Canon F. Royds, rector from 1855 to 1904.

== Architecture ==
=== Exterior ===
The church is built in sandstone with a grey slate roof. Its plan consists of a nave and chancel in five bays with a west porch and a north vestry. At the west end is a stone bellcote with a crenellated parapet and two-light bell-openings. On top of the bellcote is a short square concave spire. The windows are in Perpendicular style. Above the west porch is a clock which was made by Joyce of Whitchurch and installed as a memorial to the men of the parish who fell in the First World War.

=== Interior ===
Inside the church is a west gallery. The pulpit and reading desk, three-sided altar rails, a parish chest, and a hatchment commemorating the Aldersley family all date from the 17th century. In the church is a monumental brass to members of the Massie family of Coddington. The east window is to the memory of Samuel Aldersey who died in 1855, and the southeast window is in memory of Hugh Robert Aldersey who died aged 20 in 1848. Both of these windows are by Wailes. A third window is by Frampton in memory of Canon Royd's son, a lieutenant in the Royal Navy who died of wounds in 1884. The altar was given in 1912 in memory of Albert Lowe and the carved oak reredos was given in the same year as a memorial to Catherine Hughes. The communion rails date from 1833. The processional cross was given in memory of John James Rutter, a churchwarden from 1917 to 1926, whilst the litany desk was given in memory of Thomas Moore, the rector's warden for 55 years, and his wife Mary Ellen. At the west end of the church are two bibles, a Breeches Bible and a Bishop's Bible.

== External features ==
In the churchyard was a sundial inscribed with the date 1795 which was listed at Grade II. This has since been removed for safekeeping.

== See also ==
- Listed buildings in Coddington, Cheshire
