= Barnston Memorial =

Obelisk in Churton Road, Farndon, Cheshire, England

Coordinates: 53.09054°N 2.87705°W

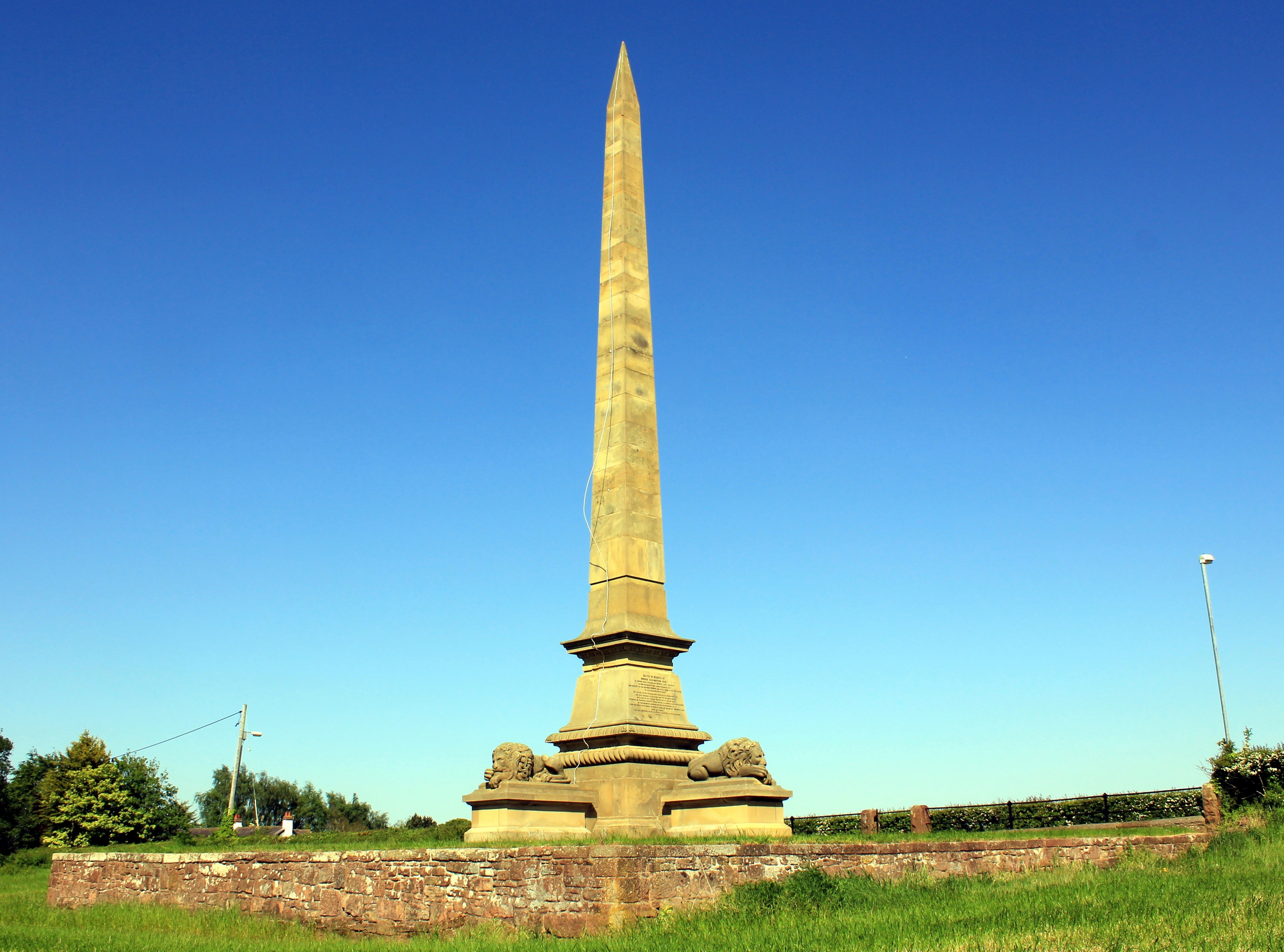
Obelisk commemorating Roger Barnston

The Barnston Memorial is an obelisk in Churton Road, Farndon, Cheshire, England. It commemorates Roger Barnston, a military officer who died in 1857 from wounds sustained at the Siege of Lucknow. His memorial consists of an obelisk standing on a plinth, surrounded by four lions. It is recorded in the National Heritage List for England as a designated Grade II* listed building.

== History ==
Major Roger Barnston served in the Crimean War, and later in India, where he died, at the age of 31, on 23 December 1857 from wounds sustained at the Siege of Lucknow in the Indian Rebellion. At a parish meeting in 1858 it was decided to provide a memorial to him. Subscribers raised a total of £426.55. Following a competition, a design by Edward A. Heffer was selected. The cost of the memorial came to £400.

== Description ==
The memorial consists of a slender obelisk standing on a plinth. It is 16.8 metres (55.1 ft) high, has a diameter of 7 metres (23.0 ft), and is made of yellow sandstone from Cefn Quarry. The obelisk starts from a concave curve, and there is a similar curve in the plinth, which contribute to the appearance of slimness. Around the plinth are statues of four crouching lions, which are described as "mourning", or "snoozing". On the west side of the plinth, facing the road, is carved the word BARNSTON, and below this is a circular plaque containing a wreath. On the east side is an inscription readings as follows.

ERECTED IN MEMORY OF
ROGER BARNSTON ESQ re
OF CREWE HILL, MAJOR AND BREVET LIEUT. COLONEL
OF HER MAJESTY'S 90TH LIGHT INFANTRY, C.B.
AND KNIGHT OF THE LEGION OF HONOUR AND OF THE ORDER OF THE
MEJDEDIE;
BY HIS TENANTS AND FRIENDS.
HE SERVED IN THE CRIMEAN WAR FROM THE 5TH DECEMBER 1854;
AND WAS PRESENT AT THE SIEGE, AND FALL OF SEBASTOPOL;
AND ALSO IN THE INDIAN MUTINY CAMPAIGN IN 1857;
IN WHICH HE SUFFERED A SEVERE WOUND WHILE GALLANTLY LEADING AN ASSAULT
AT THE RELIEF OF LUCKNOW, ON
THE 16TH NOVEMBER 1857, FROM THE EFFECTS OF WHICH HE DIED AT
CAWNPORE ON THE 23RD DECEMBER 1857;
AGED 31 YEARS
AND WAS INTERRED IN THE MILITARY CEMETERY OF THAT STATION.

The memorial was designated as a Grade II* listed building on 28 November 1984. Grade II* is the middle of the three grades of listing designated by English Heritage, and is granted to "particularly important buildings of more than special interest".

== See also ==
- Grade II* listed buildings in Cheshire West and Chester
- Listed buildings in Farndon, Cheshire
