= Holt, Wrexham =

Village in Wales

Holt
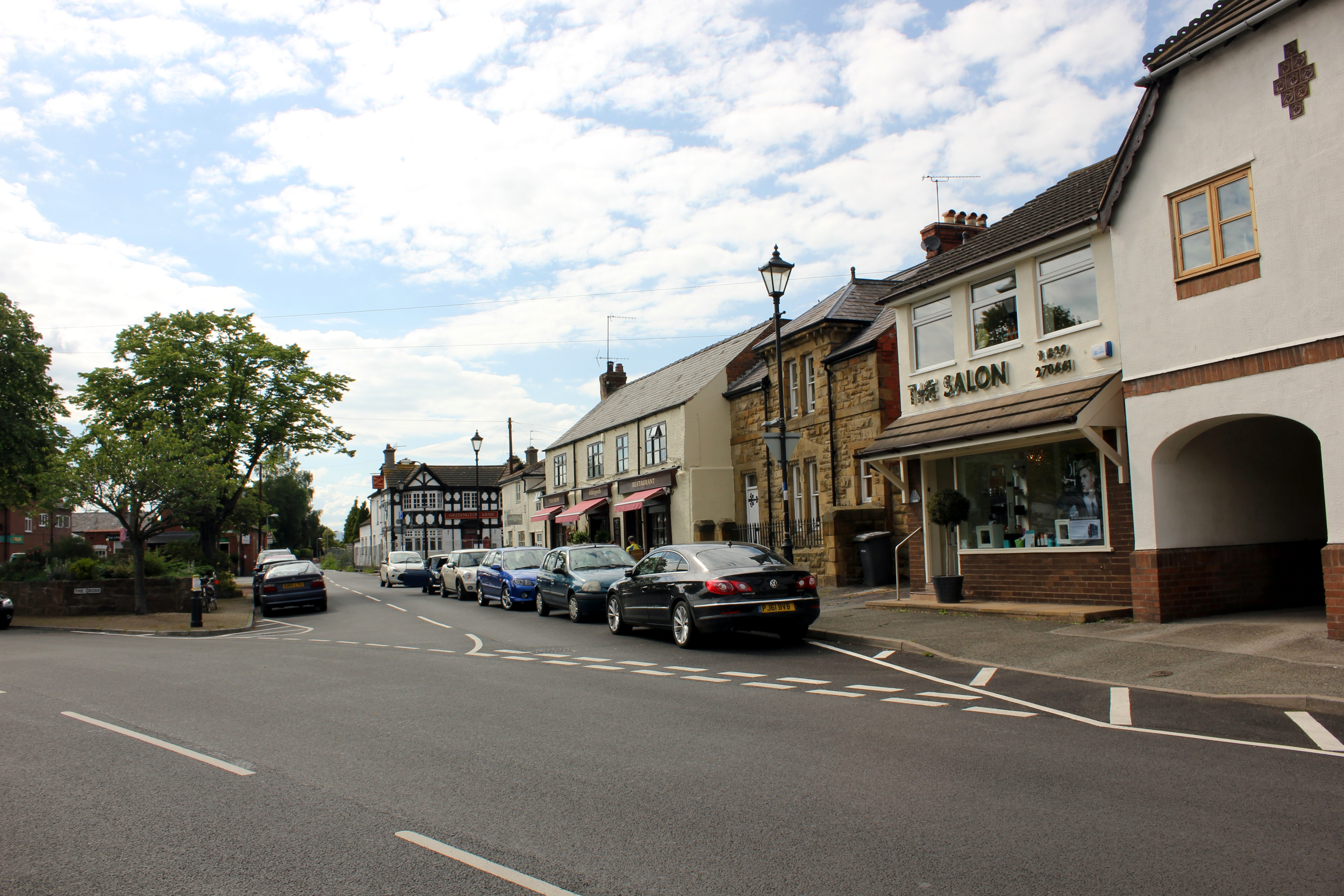
- Holt village

- Location within Wrexham
- Population: 1,554 (Community, 2021)
- OS grid reference: SJ409539
- Community: Holt
- Principal area: Wrexham
- Preserved county: Clwyd
- Country: Wales
- Sovereign state: United Kingdom
- Post town: Wrexham
- Postcode district: LL13
- Dialling code: 01829
- Police: North Wales
- Fire: North Wales
- Ambulance: Welsh
- UK Parliament: Wrexham
- Senedd Cymru – Welsh Parliament: Wrexham
- List of places UK Wales Wrexham 53.079°N 2.881°W Map of the community

Holt is a medieval village and community in Wrexham County Borough, Wales. It is situated on the border with England and within the historic county boundaries of Denbighshire. Holt Castle was begun by Edward I shortly after the English conquest of Wales in 1277. Farndon lies just over the River Dee.

== Etymology ==
The Old English word holt meant a "wood" or "thicket" and is a common element in place names over the border in England. Welsh uses the same name for the village but in the past, it included the definite article, appearing as Yr Holt.

== Area ==
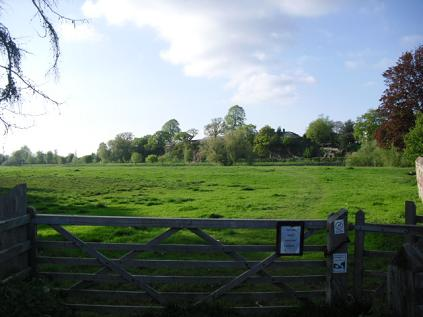
Site of 'Bovium' Roman Tileworks for Legionary Chester

The district has been occupied since at least the Roman period. A brickworks (possibly called Bovium) supplied clay tiles and pottery to the Roman fort of Deva Victrix, eight miles away (modern Chester). The works was located just downstream from the modern village. In the early 20th century, six kilns, a bath house, sheds and barracks were found there on the banks of the River Dee.

Three Bronze Age burial urns have also been found in Holt.

== History ==
=== Roman site and early medieval longhouse ===
Excavations to the north-west of Holt have revealed a major Roman site for making tiles and pottery. It is thought that the tiles were supplied to the Roman fort at Deva Victrix (modern Chester). In 2024, remains of a medieval longhouse were also discovered. The long and narrow building was thought to have been used as a communal dwelling.

== Village ==
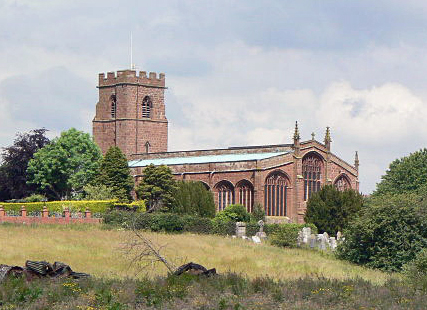
St Chad's Church

There is a medieval market cross in the centre of Holt. The church of St Chad has parts dating to the 15th century and 17th century.

The population was 1,058 inhabitants in the 1841 census.

== Medieval bridge ==
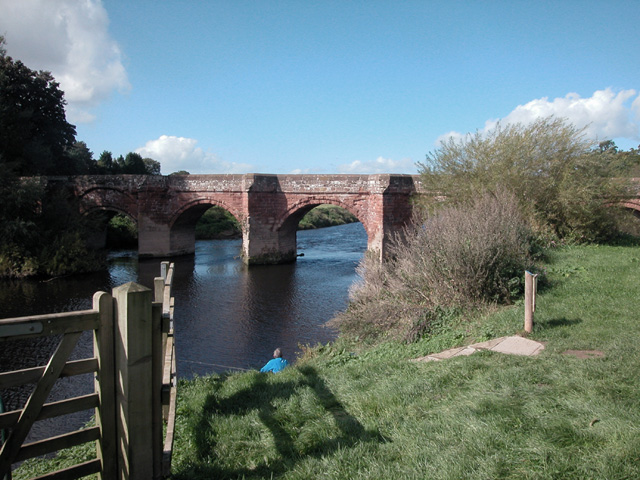
The bridge between Holt and Farndon upstream on the English side

A Grade I listed 14th-century sandstone bridge links Holt with the English village of Farndon across the River Dee. Records from the county court of Chester in 1368, state that:

"the jury presented that John, earl of Warenne, late Lord of Bromfield, had constructed a bridge across the River Dee (during 1338)... and upon that bridge is a fortified gateway. The jury then claimed that illegal toll was being extorted from workmen daily crossing the bridge, and that the town of Holt was giving shelter to felons who ambushed Cheshire folk."

A survey of 1627 described the bridge:

"contayninge 10 arches which River divideth Two Sheires, namely Cheshire and Denbye... Upon the fifth Arch from Holt standeth a Tower or Gatehouse of Fortification... [the text then describes the Lady's Chapel in the tower]... Upon the other end of the fortificacion next unto the manor of Farndon next unto the Manor of Farndon is layd out in Masons Works a Lyon to the full passant. And like Lyon is upon the gates of Holt Castell. The county of Chester doth repair the bridge to the Lyon."

Sixteen years later, William Brereton attacked the bridge for the Parliamentarians:

"for which end they had also made a towre and drawbridge and strong gates upon the bridge soe as they and wee coceived it difficult if not altogether ympossible to make way for our passage."

Despite this he, Thomas Myddelton and their forces took the bridge on 9 November 1643 when they cast 'some grenados amongst the Welshmen'.

Thomas Pennant recorded ten arches in 1754 (and had been told a datestone of 1354 was there until recently, which contradicts the more likely date of 1338) but Hubbard in Buildings of Wales only saw eight. The third arch, viewed from the Holt river bank, shows the strengthened arch where the drawbridge once stood.

== Governance ==
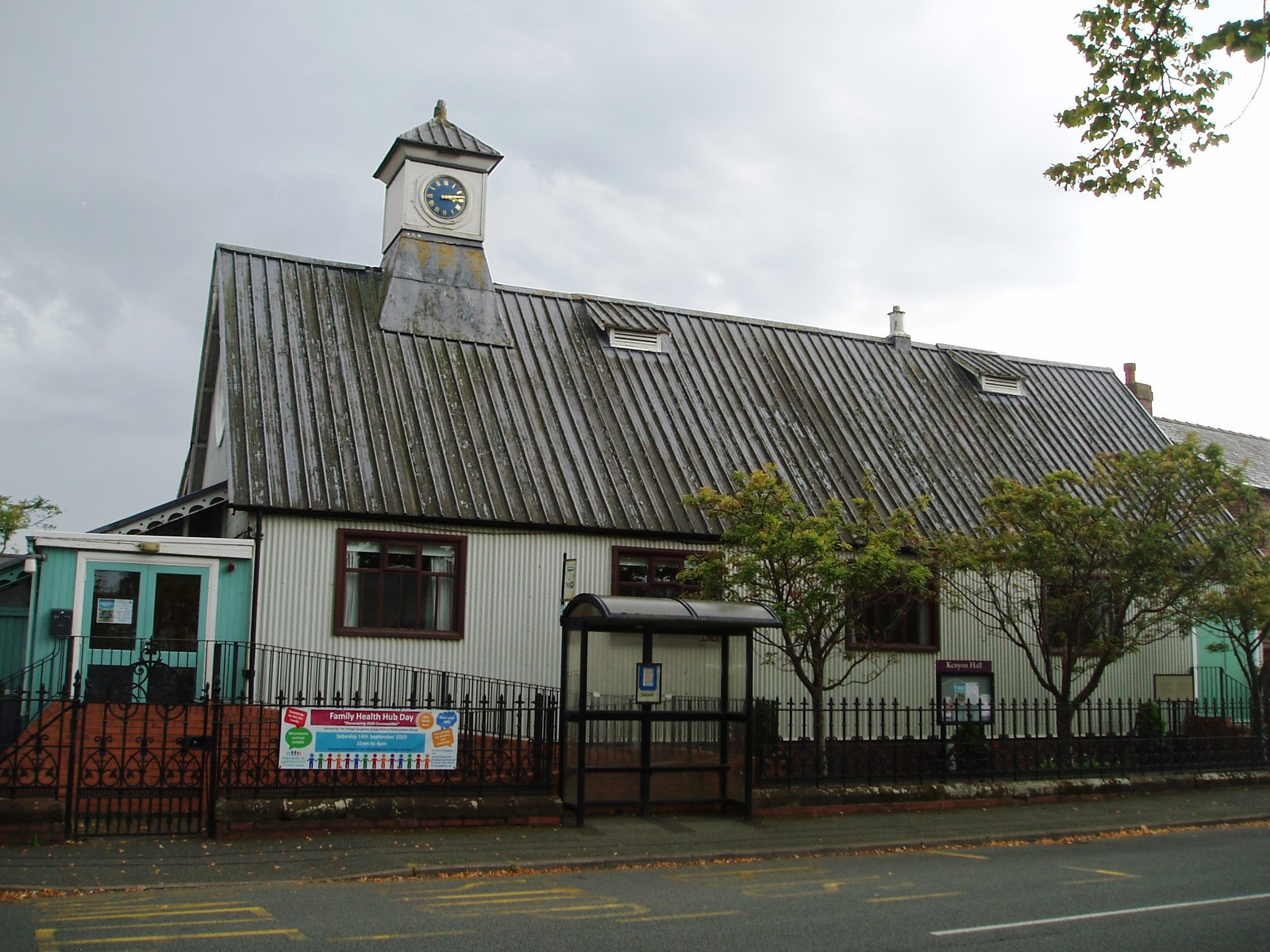
Kenyon Hall, Castle Street

Map of the Holt electoral ward in Wrexham County Borough, Wales.

There are two tiers of local government covering Holt, at community and county borough level: Holt Community Council and Wrexham County Borough Council. The community council generally meets at Kenyon Hall on Castle Street.

=== Administrative history ===
Holt was an ancient parish. It was subdivided into six townships: Cacca Dutton, Dutton Diffeth, Dutton-y-Bran, Ridley, Sutton, and a Holt township covering the northern part of the parish including Holt itself and adjoining countryside. From the 17th century onwards, parishes were gradually given various civil functions under the poor laws, in addition to their original ecclesiastical functions. In some cases, including Holt, the civil functions were exercised by each township separately rather than the parish as a whole. In 1866, the legal definition of 'parish' was changed to be the areas used for administering the poor laws, and so the townships also became civil parishes. The five southern townships from the old parish were merged into a new civil parish called Isycoed in 1935.

Holt anciently formed part of the cantref of Maelor within the Kingdom of Powys. The area was contested between English and Welsh rulers between the 11th and 13th centuries. By the 13th century, Maelor was split into Maelor Saesneg (English Maelor) and Maelor Gymraeg (Welsh Maelor), also known as Bromfield. Holt was in Bromfield, which became part of Denbighshire on the county's creation in 1536.

Holt was also an ancient borough, having been incorporated under a municipal charter issued by Thomas Fitzalan, 5th Earl of Arundel, around 1409. By the 19th century the borough had very few functions, an so it was left unreformed when most boroughs were converted into municipal boroughs in 1836. The borough was eventually abolished in 1886.

The civil parish of Holt was converted into a community and became part of the new borough of Wrexham Maelor in Clwyd in 1974 under the Local Government Act 1972. The upper tiers of local government were reorganised again in 1996, when the modern county borough of Wrexham was created.

== People from Holt ==
- Roger Edgeworth, 16th century theologian, born in Holt Castle
- Leigh Richmond Roose, a Welsh footballer and international goalkeeper from Holt.
- H. G. Wells, the writer, was briefly teacher in a local private school, Holt Academy, in youth.
