= St Chad's Church, Farndon =

Coordinates: 53.0840°N 2.8774°W

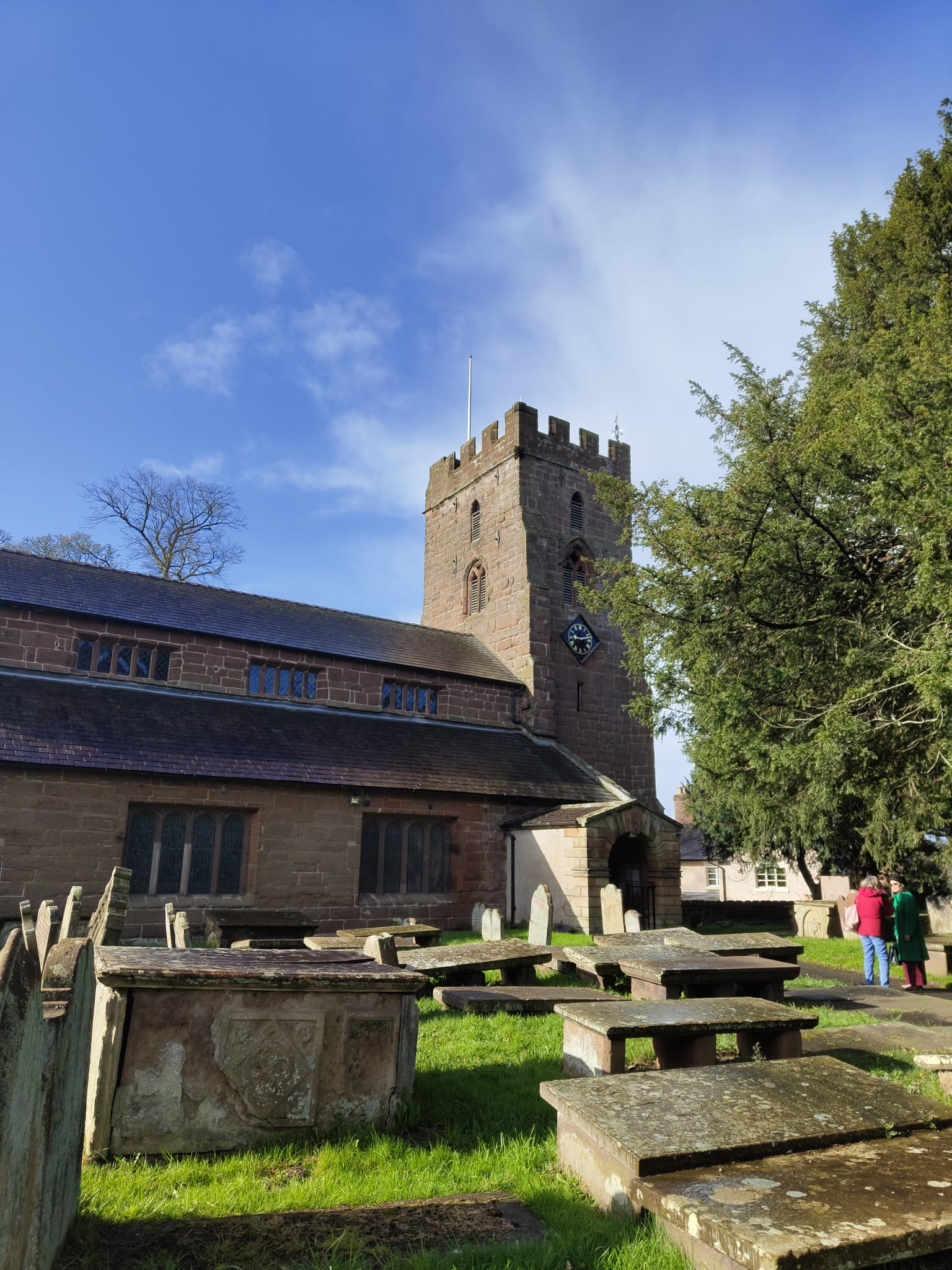
- St Chad's Church, Farndon, from the northeast

- Location in Cheshire
- OS grid reference: SJ 413,544
- Location: Farndon, Cheshire
- Country: England
- Denomination: Anglican
- Website: St Chad's, Farndon

History
- Status: Parish church
- Dedication: Chad of Mercia
- Events: Damaged during the Civil War

Architecture
- Functional status: Active
- Heritage designation: Grade II*
- Designated: 1 March 1967
- Architect(s): Kelly and Edwards, John Douglas
- Architectural type: Church
- Style: Gothic

Specifications
- Materials: Red sandstone, grey slate roofs

Administration
- Province: York
- Diocese: Chester
- Archdeaconry: Chester
- Deanery: Malpas
- Parish: Farndon, St Chad

Clergy
- Vicar: Rev Captain David Scurr

St Chad's Church is in the village of Farndon, Cheshire, England. It is an active Anglican parish church in the diocese of Chester, the archdeaconry of Chester and the deanery of Malpas. Its benefice is combined with that of St Mary, Coddington. The church is recorded in the National Heritage List for England as a designated Grade II* listed building.

== History ==
A church was present on the site at the time of the survey for the Domesday Book and it is likely that Saxon churches had previously been there. The base of the tower and the plan of the church date from the 14th century although around 1622 the historian Webb described it as "a fair new church". During the English Civil War the church was badly damaged. In 1643 it was being used as a barracks for the Parliamentarians under Sir William Brereton when it was attacked by Royalists. During the battle the church was set on fire. It continued to be used by the Parliamentarians until 1645 when it was abandoned and left derelict. Apart from the tower the church was completely rebuilt in 1658 by William Barnston. Further restorations were carried out in the 19th and 20th centuries. The 19th-century restoration was carried out by Kelly and Edwards, other than the southeast chapel which was by John Douglas.

== Architecture ==
=== Exterior ===
The church is built in red sandstone with grey slate roofs. The lower three stages of the tower date from the 14th century and the top section dates from the 17th century. The plan of the church consists of a nave with clerestory, north and south aisles, a chancel and a north porch. Protruding from the east end of the south wall are a vestry and the Barnston chapel. The tower is at the west end.

=== Interior ===
The furniture includes a 17th-century holy table, and a parish chest dated 1729. Three benefaction boards are dated 1672, 1786 and 1838. In the Barnston chapel is the Civil War window which depicts some of the Cheshire Royalists, among them Richard Grosvenor, Sir William Mainwaring, William Barnston and Sir Francis Gamull of Buerton. The chapel also contains wall memorials to the members of the Barnston family, including two Randle Holme memorial boards. There is a ring of eight bells, all cast in 1841 by John Taylor and Company. The parish registers begin in 1603 and the churchwardens' accounts in 1744.

== External features ==
A pair of table tombs in the churchyard are listed at Grade II. They are of yellow sandstone and date from the early 18th century. On one is an image of an hourglass, on the other a skull and crossbones. A sundial in the churchyard is dated 1793. The churchyard also contains war graves of two British soldiers of World War I, Sergeant Joseph Easter and Private Thomas Harrison.

== See also ==
- Listed buildings in Farndon, Cheshire
- List of church restorations, amendments and furniture by John Douglas
