= Coddington, Cheshire =

Civil parish in Cheshire, England

Coordinates: 53.095°N 2.818°W

Coddington
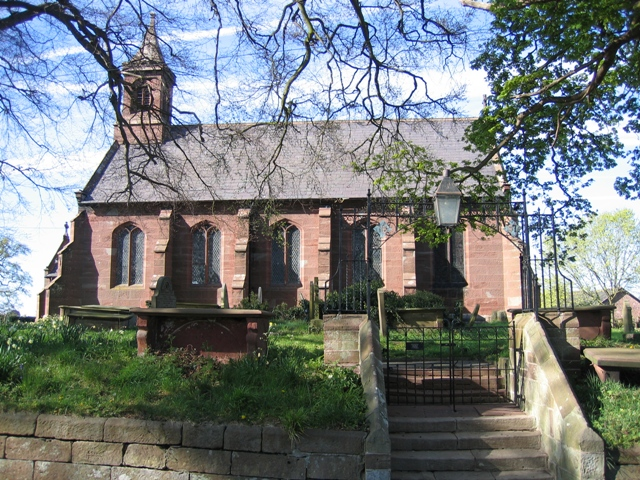
- St Mary's Church, Coddington

- Location within Cheshire
- OS grid reference: SJ452553
- Civil parish: Coddington
- Unitary authority: Cheshire West and Chester
- Ceremonial county: Cheshire
- Region: North West
- Country: England
- Sovereign state: United Kingdom
- Post town: CHESTER
- Postcode district: CH3
- Dialling code: 01829
- Police: Cheshire
- Fire: Cheshire
- Ambulance: North West
- UK Parliament: Chester South and Eddisbury

Coddington is a civil parish in the unitary authority of Cheshire West and Chester and the ceremonial county of Cheshire, England.

== See also ==
- Listed buildings in Coddington, Cheshire
- St Mary's Church, Coddington
