= Crewe-by-Farndon =

Former civil parish in Cheshire, England

Coordinates: 53.066°N 2.866°W

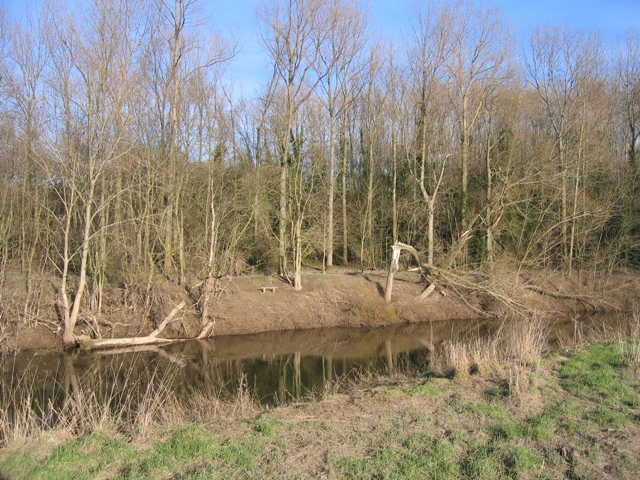
- Bend in the River Dee

- Location within Cheshire
- Population: 45 (2001)
- OS grid reference: SJ4252
- Civil parish: Farndon
- Unitary authority: Cheshire West and Chester
- Ceremonial county: Cheshire
- Region: North West
- Country: England
- Sovereign state: United Kingdom
- Post town: CHESTER
- Postcode district: CH3
- Dialling code: 01829
- Police: Cheshire
- Fire: Cheshire
- Ambulance: North West
- UK Parliament: Chester South and Eddisbury

Crewe-by-Farndon is a settlement and former civil parish, now in the parish of Farndon, in the borough of Cheshire West and Chester and ceremonial county of Cheshire in England. In 2001 the parish had a population of 45. Crewe was formerly a township in the parish of Farndon, in 1866 Crewe became a separate civil parish, on 1 April 2015 the parish was abolished and merged with Farndon.

There is a small Methodist Chapel, founded in 1858, located on Crewe Lane South. This was originally Primitive Methodist but is now part of the South Cheshire Circuit and the local Cheshire Hills Mission Area.

The parish contained one listed building, Crewe Hill, which is designed at Grade II. This grade is the lowest of the three gradings given to listed buildings and is applied to "buildings of national importance and special interest".
