= Roger Edgeworth =

English theologian

- Born: c.1488 Holt Castle, Denbighshire, Wales
- Died: Jan 1560
- Burial place: Wells Cathedral
- Education: Oriel College, Oxford University
- Occupation: clergyman
- Known for: Religious writings as a conservative Anglican
- Notable work: Sermons Very Fruitful, Godly and Learned (1557)

Roger Edgeworth (1488–1560) was an Anglo-Welsh Catholic theologian best known for the collected sermons he published during the reign of Mary I.

== Early life ==
Edgeworth was born c. 1488 at Holt Castle, situated on the banks of the Dee, in what became the county of Denbighshire, Wales, and the Diocese of Chester. He was one of the first pupils at a grammar school founded in 1501 in Banbury, attached to St John's Hospital, before becoming a student in the University of Oxford c. 1503. He graduated with a B.A. on 16 January 1508, and was elected a fellow of Oriel College 8 November 1508 with the support of Bishop William Smyth, who founded the fellowship. Edgeworth was admitted to the fellowship on 11 June 1510.

Edgeworth commenced his Master of Arts on 9 February 1511–12, was admitted Bachelor of Theology on 13 October 1519, and created Doctor of Theology on 2 July 1526. During this period he was employed by various institutions including Eton College. By this time he received his doctorate, he had established a considerable reputation as a preacher and theologian.

== Career ==
In 1525 Edgeworth was appointed prior of the Guild of Kalendars in Bristol, which was known as a centre for orthodox study and teaching. By May 1529 he was serving as a minor official of the legatine court formed to discuss Henry VIII's divorce from Catherine of Aragon. He became known as one of the 'conservative Henricians', who supported the king's claim to supremacy over the church of England, while remaining doctrinally committed to the teachings and practices of the Catholic church. Many of this group went on to be appointed by the King to senior roles within the English church as well as being used for diplomatic missions. Edgeworth received a variety of livings and appointments and was made a canon residentiary at Wells Cathedral by 1535. This role led to him preaching in Redcliffe, Bristol from 1535 to 1542, which was then part of the Diocese of Bath and Wells. He promoted conservative doctrine that opposed the Protestant teaching of Hugh Latimer, Bishop of Worcester (1535–1539), who held sway over Bristol north of the River Avon, then part of Diocese of Worcester. Edgeworth's earliest recorded sermons are those he preached in Bristol, where, he later recalled:

I preached at Redcliffe crosse, in the good and worshipfull citie of Bristow, in sundry sermons, although I was interrupted many yeares by the confederacie of Hughe Lathamer, then aspiringe to a bisshopriche, and after beinge bishop of worcester, and ordinary of the greatest part of the sayd Bristow, and infecting the whole.

Bristol in these years was the focus of violent disputes over religion between protestants and religious conservatives. This ultimately led to the most outspoken conservative, William Hubberdyne, being imprisoned in the Tower of London for allegedly claiming that that it was heresy to deny the Pope's authority. Since Henry VIII had done precisely that in his 1534 Act of Supremacy, such a claim would be treasonable.

Following the execution of Thomas Cromwell in 1540 and the King's shift back to a more conservative religious position, Edgeworth's career advanced further. When the Diocese of Bristol was established on 4 June 1542, Edgeworth was appointed as prebendary of the second stall in Bristol Cathedral. On 10 October 1544 Edgeworth was made a royal chaplain, receiving further livings and ecclesiastical appointments to support his income, such as the vicarage of St. Cuthbert at Wells.

Edgeworth's career suffered during the reign of Edward VI (1547–1553), who was much more committed to protestantism than his father. However, under Queen Mary (1553–1559), Edgeworth was promoted once more. He was made Chancellor of the Diocese of Wells 30 April 1554, following the deprivation of John Taylor, alias Cardmaker. In 1557 Edgeworth published his collected sermons, which demonstrated his longstanding commitment to catholic doctrine.

== Death and reputation ==
Edgeworth died between 24 December 1559 and 17 January 1560, probably as a result of a major influenza epidemic that swept England at that time. He was buried before the choir door in Wells Cathedral, with his will being proved on 1 June 1560. This included bequests to Oriel College, Wells Cathedral and members of his family.

Edgeworth's posthumous reputation was that of a conservative theologian who showed his truest colours in the reign of 'Bloody Mary':

When K. Hen. 8 had extirpated the pope's power, he seemed to be very moderate, and also in the reign of K. Ed. 6, but when qu. Mary succeeded he shew'd himself a most zealous person for the Roman Catholic religion, and a great enemy to Luther and reformers.

== Works ==
Edgeworth's collected sermons, first published 1557, were edited and republished by Janet Wilson in 1993. Her volume is accompanied by a lengthy introduction which includes a 24-page biography of Edgeworth, an evaluation of his doctrine and a discussion of his position within rapidly changing world of the English Reformation.

One of Edgeworth's nineteenth-century biographers notes that:

He was the author of: 1. 'Resolutions concerning the Sacraments.' In Burnet's 'Hist. of the Reformation.' 2. 'Resolutions of some Questions relating to Bishops and Priests, and of other matters tending to the Reformation of the Church made by Henry VIII,’ ibid. 3. 'Sermons, very Fruitfull, Godly, and Learned, … With a repertorie or table, directinge to many notable matters expressed in the same Sermons. In ædibus Roberti Caley,’ London, 4to, 1557, containing 307 folios in black letter. At the beginning of the eighteenth sermon he states that he had abstained from preaching for five or six years, viz. during the reign of Edward VI; consequently the former sermons were delivered in Henry VIII's time, and the rest after Queen Mary's accession. Dibdin, in his 'Library Companion' (i. 81–5), after giving copious extracts from this very scarce volume, remarks that 'upon the whole Edgeworth is less nervous and familiar than Latimer, less eloquent than Fox, and less learned and logical than Drant. He is, however, a writer of a fine fancy, and an easy and flowing style.

== Bibliography ==
Roger Edgeworth. (1557) Sermons very fruitfull, godly and learned. London.

Wood, Anthony A; Bliss, Philip (1813). 'Roger Edgeworth', in Athenae Oxonienses. An exact history of all the writers and bishops who have had their education in the University of Oxford...a new edition with additions and continuation by Philip Bliss. Vol. 1. London. pp. 315-316.

Robert Williams (1852). 'Edgeworth, Roger', in Enwogion Cymru. A Biographical Dictionary of Eminent Welshmen, from the earliest times to the present, William Rees, London. pp. 129-130.

Thompson Cooper (1888). 'Edgeworth, Roger, D.D.' in Dictionary of National Biography. Vol. 16. Macmillan & Co. London, pp. 385-386.

Elwyn Evans. (1959). 'Edgeworth, Roger (died 1560), Roman Catholic divine' in Dictionary of Welsh Biography. University of Wales.

Janet Wilson, ed. (1993) Sermons very fruitfull, godly and learned by Roger Edgeworth: Preaching in the Reformation c.1535–c.1553. D. S. Brewer, Woodbridge.

Janet M. Wilson. (2004). 'Edgeworth, Roger (c. 1488–1559/60), Church of England clergyman and religious controversialist', Oxford Dictionary of National Biography.
