= Holt Castle =

Castle ruins in Holt, Wrexham, Wales

- Castell Holt
- Part of the County Borough of Wrexham
- Holt, Wales
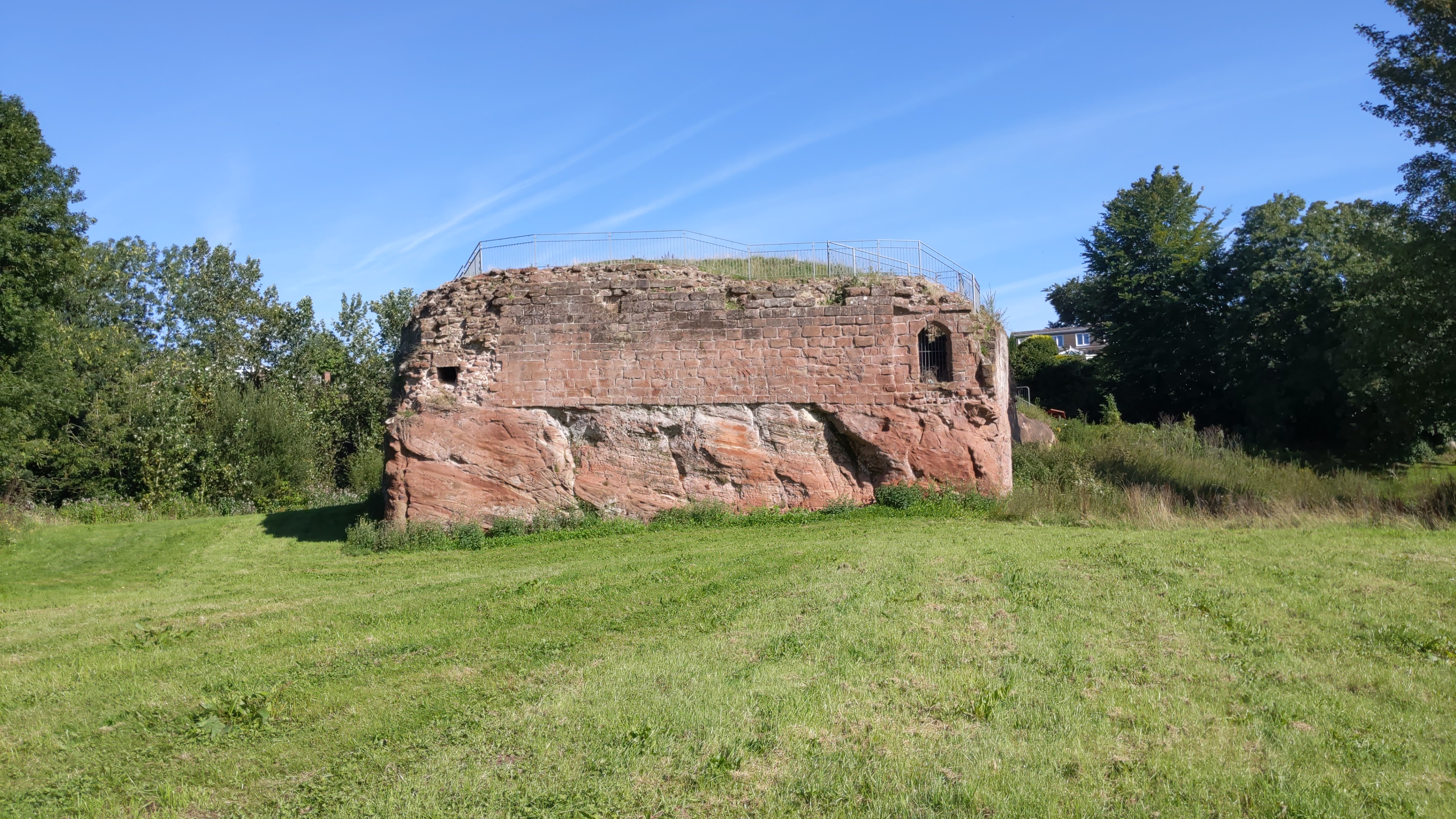
- Holt Castle remnants

Site information
- Type: Pentagonal enclosure castle
- Open to the public: Yes
- Condition: Complete ruin. Nothing remains of the castle except a few examples of masonry.

Location
- Location in Wales
- Location within Wales
- Coordinates: 53.077919°N 2.880256°W
- Height: Up to 10 metres (33 ft)

Site history
- Built: c. 1282–1311
- Built by: John de Warenne
- Materials: Sandstone
- Demolished: 1675–1683
- Battles/wars: Attacked during the uprising of Owain Glyndŵr
- Events: Welsh Wars

Holt Castle (Welsh: Castell Holt) was a medieval castle on the Welsh–English border, by the banks of the River Dee, in the village of Holt, Wrexham County Borough, Wales. Work began on the castle in the 13th century during the Welsh Wars.

In the medieval period, the five-towered fortress was actually known as Castrum Leonis or Castle Lyons because it had a lion motif carved into the stonework above its main gate. In the 17th century, almost all the stonework was removed from the site; only the sandstone foundation and a small amount of masonry survives.

== Construction ==
A reconstruction of Holt Castle in 1495

The castle, which was constructed between 1277 and 1311, was built from local sandstone on top of a 12-metre (39 ft) high promontory. It was shaped like a pentagon with towers at each corner.

The castle had a stepped ramp up to a main gateway, barbican, inner ward, postern and curtain walls. There was also a water-filled moat that was fed from the River Dee.

The design of the castle featured towers that were built against the face of the rock outside the curtain wall, similar to the inner wards at Ruthin and at Conwy.

== History ==
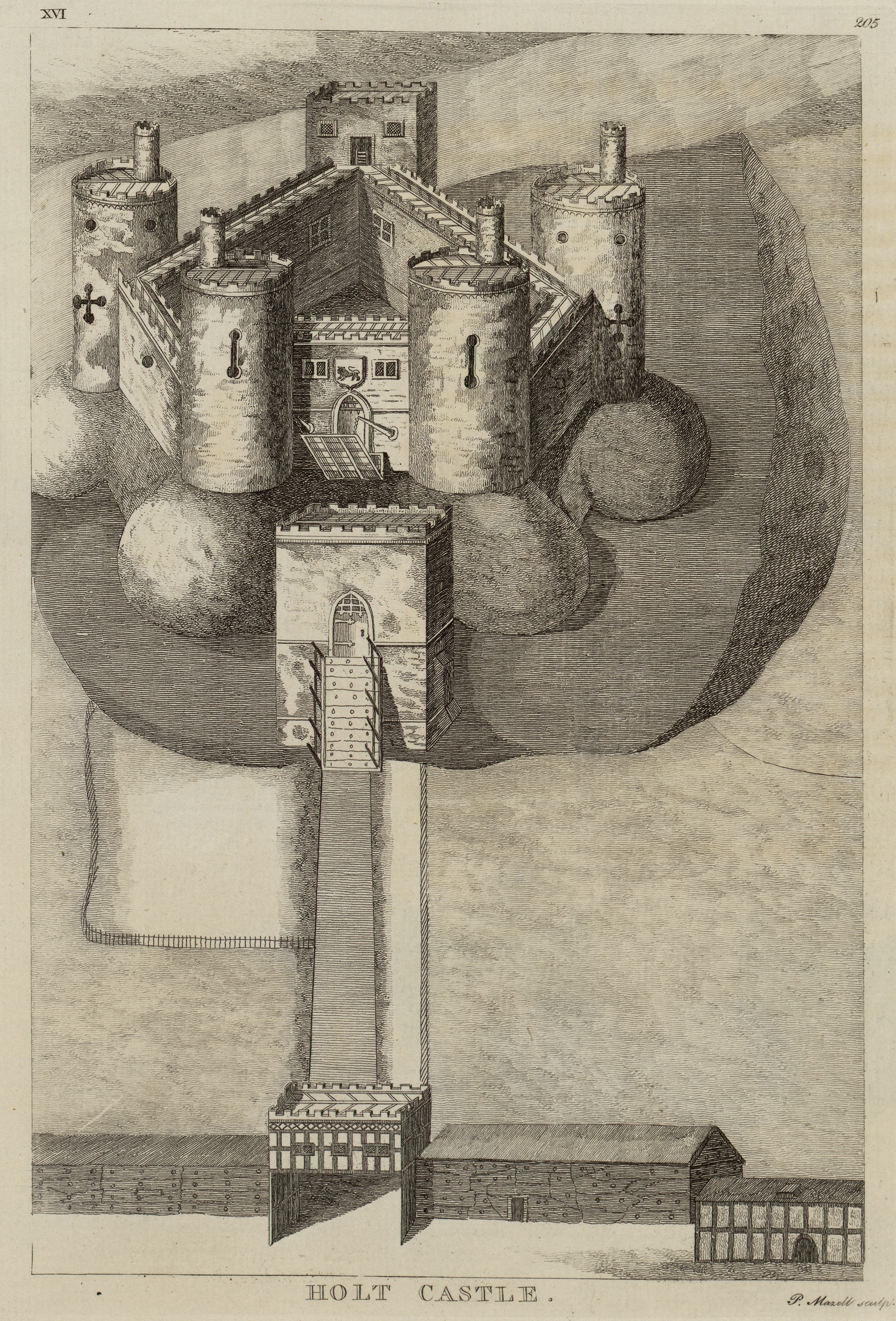
Holt Castle by Thomas Pennant, 1781

Holt castle was started by Edward I on a sandstone base next to the River Dee soon after the invasion of North Wales in 1277. In 1282 Edward presented the Welsh lands of Bromfield and Yale in which Holt was situated to loyal lord John de Warrene, who was also given the task of completing the castle. By 1311 the castle had been finished and a planned town laid out next to it for the use of English settlers.

A century later, Welsh forces burned down the town in 1400 during the uprising of Owain Glyndŵr; although the castle was not taken. By the 16th century Holt Castle had fallen into disuse and ruin. The English Elizabethan map maker John Norden surveyed the castle and noted that it was "nowe in great decay".

For most of the First English Civil War, Holt was garrisoned by Royalists troops. It was captured by the Parliamentarians in 1643 but retaken by the Royalists in spring of 1644. After they had surrendered, thirteen of the Parliamentarian garrison were put to the sword and their bodies were thrown into the moat. In January 1647, after a siege that lasted for nine months the Royalist governor, Sir Richard Lloyd, surrendered Holt to Thomas Mytton (the commander of the besieging Parliamentarians)—after Holt's surrender Harlech was the only stronghold in Wales still under Royalist control and it fell to Mytton in March of that year. After the surrender, Colonel Roger Pope was appointed Parliamentary governor of Holt. By order of Parliament, Holt was slighted later that year.

Between 1675 and 1683 much of the castle was taken away by Sir Thomas Grosvenor, 3rd Baronet of Eaton, who used barges to carry the stonework downstream to rebuild Eaton Hall after the English Civil War.

In the 18th century all that remained of Holt Castle was part of a tower and a rectangular building.

== Preservation ==
The only sizeable part of Holt Castle that remains is perched on its sandstone base. Some masonry features are still visible, including the lower walls of the inner keep, the postern gate, a buttress, a chute exit and the foundations of the outer gate's square tower. In 2015, four years of extensive restoration work to remove vegetation, install steps and repair extant masonry was completed. A series of archaeological surveys of the site had also been undertaken.

== See also ==
- Roger Edgeworth, born in Holt Castle
- List of castles in Wales

== Bibliography ==
- Bingley, William (1839), Excursions in North Wales: including Aberystwith and the Devil's Bridge, intended as a guide to tourists (3 ed.), Longman, Orme, p. 226
- Carlton, Charles (1992), Going to the Wars: The Experience of the British Civil Wars, 1638–1651 (illustrated, reprint ed.), Routledge, p. 258, ISBN 9780415103916
- Pettifer, Adrian (2000), Welsh Castles: A Guide by Counties (illustrated ed.), Boydell & Brewer, p. 66, ISBN 9780851157788
- Williams, W. R. (1895), Parliamentary History of the Principality of Wales, from the earliesr times to the present day, 1541–1895 ..., Brecknock: Priv. Print. for the author by E. Davis and Bell, p. 116
