= Geufron Hall =

House in Denbighshire, Wales

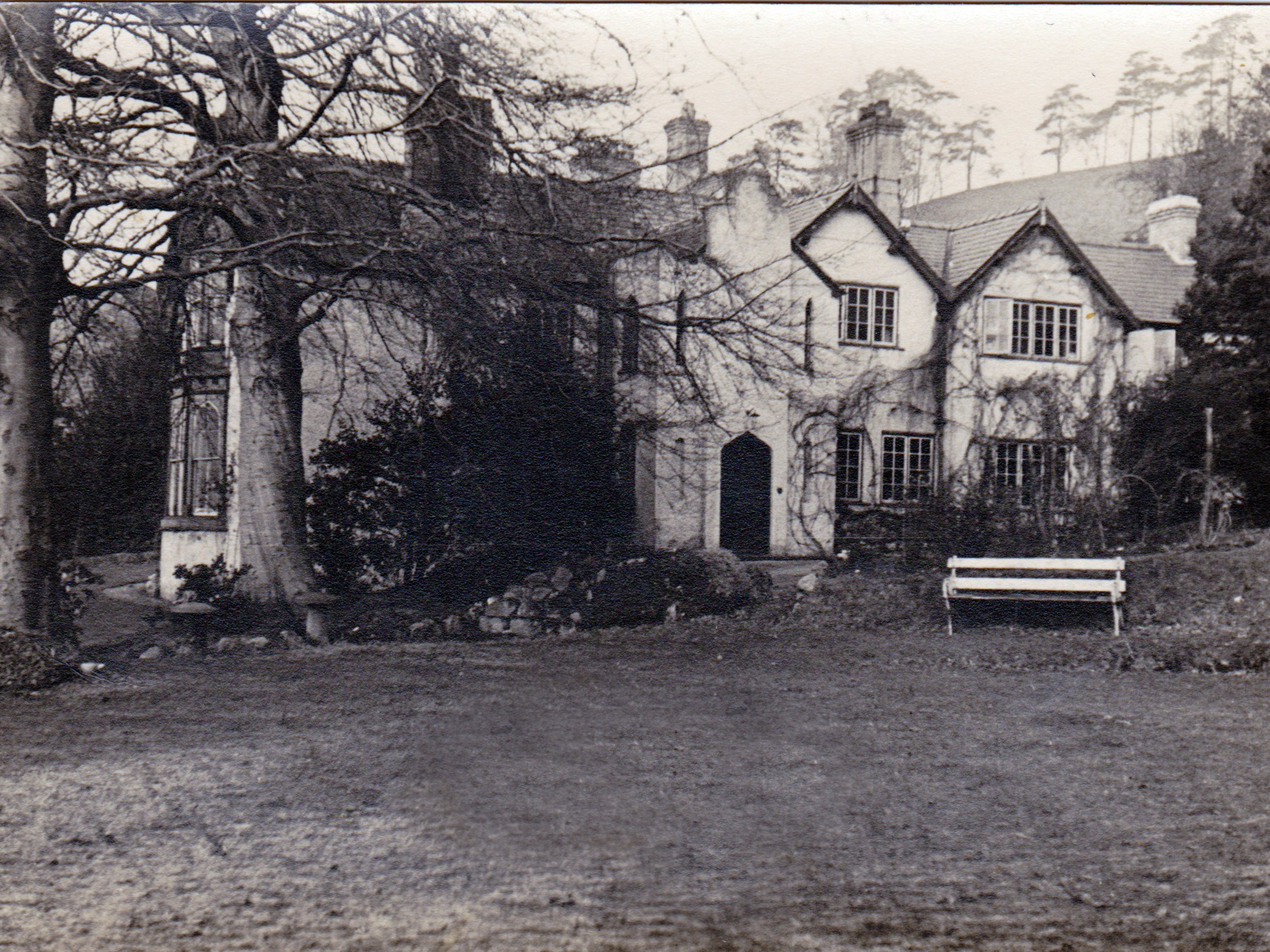
- Geufron Hall in Geufron, Llangollen in 1945

- Location within Wales

General information
- Status: Built 1837
- Location: Llangollen, Wales, Wales
- Coordinates: 52.9768°N 3.1633°W

Geufron Hall is a historic house in Llangollen. Built in 1837, it was occupied by Dr Richard (Dick) Drinkwater and Dr Fred Drinkwater in the years immediately prior to the Second World War (1939–45) and used as their family home and surgery. Records of the original Geufron estate date back to the mid-18th century.

The location of the house is in the hamlet of Geufron, some distance outside the town of Llangollen. This would have meant a long and strenuous walk to the surgery by any local people needing treatment, as the house is at a height of 250 metres, almost midway between the town and Castell Dinas Bran.

After falling into a state of disrepair in the post-war years, the house was bought and restored in the 1960s. This necessitated pulling down the front of the house and rebuilding the frontage some two metres back, making the house significantly shorter than it once was. As a result, the cellar protrudes into the garden and is covered by a paved terrace.

The house still contains a carved wall frieze made by the two spinster daughters featuring the Drinkwater family motto: "Vincit Veritas" (truth conquers). The present owners also display the original brass plaque advertising the services of "Dr Drinkwater, surgeon and apothecary". The old doctor's dispensary is still in the garden and the house is also said to contain windows from the ruins of Valle Crucis Abbey, installed when it was first built.

Geufron Hall is now used as a family home and bed and breakfast establishment.
